= Nissa bint Ra'ad =

Jordanian princess

- Born: January 11, 1981 (age 45); Amman, Jordan
- Issue: Radwan Hajjar; Faisal Hajjar; Lana Hajjar
Names
- Fakhrelnissa bint Ra'ad
- House: Hashemite
- Father: Ra'ad bin Zeid
- Mother: Majda Ra'ad
- Occupation: Artist

Princess Fakhrelnissa bint Ra'ad (Arabic: فخر النساء بنت رعد; born January 11, 1981), better known as Princess Nissa Raad, is a member of the Jordanian royal family and an artist.

== Family ==
Princess Nissa is a great-granddaughter of Sharif Hussein bin Ali. Her father is Prince Ra'ad bin Zeid, who is the son of Prince Zeid of the Hashemite House and Princess Fahrelnissa Zeid, a renowned Turkish artist. Her mother was Princess Majda Ra'ad, who was of Swedish origin.

She has four elder brothers; Prince Zeid bin Ra'ad, Prince Mired bin Ra'ad, Prince Firas bin Ra'ad and Prince Faisal bin Ra'ad.

Princess Nissa has three children; two sons and one daughter: Radwan Hajjar (born August 8, 2006), Faisal Hajjar (born December 14, 2007), Lana Hajjar (born April 30, 2012).

== Education ==
Princess Nissa graduated from Brown University, Rhode Island, in 2002 with a BA in history, before receiving an MSc in urban design and development from University College London in 2004.

== Career ==
Princess Nissa is an artist who has had several sold-out solo exhibitions in Amman as well as in Istanbul. She has participated in numerous group exhibitions and art fairs both locally and internationally including Dubai, Cairo, Paris, Bahrain, New York, Madrid and Beirut. Rich textures, vibrant colors and bold lines are ubiquitous in her whimsical work which is inspired by both urban and natural environments.

Princess Nissa has worked on various charitable collaborations and educational events involving the arts and contributed to many art charity auctions. She has patronized numerous art exhibitions, such as "A Sense of Palace", which took place in 2019 and showcased contemporary indigenous Australian artwork and was held at the Jordan National Gallery of Fine Arts, in collaboration with the Australian embassy in Amman.
