= Majda Ra'ad =

Swedish-born princess (1942–2025)

- Born: Margaretha Inga Elisabeth Lind; 5 September 1942; Arboga, Sweden
- Died: 3 January 2025 (aged 82); Amman, Jordan
- Burial: Royal Cemetery, Amman, Jordan
- Spouse: Ra'ad bin Zeid (m. 1963)
- Issue: Zeid; Mired; Firas; Faisal; Fakhrelnissa
- House: Hashemite
- Father: Sven Gustaf Lind
- Mother: Carin Inga Birgitta Gunlaug Grönwall

Princess Majda Ra'ad (Arabic: ماجدة رعد; born Margaretha Inga Elisabeth Lind; 5 September 1942 – 3 January 2025) was a Swedish-born Jordanian member of the Hashemite House who was the wife of Prince Ra'ad bin Zeid, the current pretender to the defunct Kingdom of Iraq and Syria and the Lord Chamberlain of Jordan. She was a Jordanian princess by marriage and a member of the House of Hashem.

== Early life and family ==
Margaretha Inga Elisabeth Lind was born on 5 September 1942 in Arboga to Sven Gustaf Lind and Carin Inga Birgitta Gunlaug Grönwall. She was raised in Södertälje. She studied at Colin Leclaire High School.

== Marriage and issue ==
Lind married Prince Ra'ad bin Zeid, son of Prince Zeid bin Hussein and Princess Fahrelnissa Zeid, in 1963. They were first married in a civil ceremony on 30 June in Södertälje, Sweden, and religiously at the Raghadan Palace in Amman on 5 August. They have five children:

- Prince Zeid bin Ra'ad (born 26 January 1964), married to Sarah Butler (Now Princess Sarah Zeid). They have 3 children: Prince Ra'ad bin Zeid (born 17 May 2001), Princess Hala bint Zeid (born 13 March 2003) and Princess Azizah bint Zeid.
- Prince Mired bin Ra'ad (born 11 June 1965), married to Dina Muhammad Khalifeh (Now HRH Princess Dina Mired). They have 3 children: Princess Shirin bint Mired (born 19 May 1993, who married Jafer Mohammed Nabulsi on 4 October 2021), Prince Rakan bin Mired (born 20 November 1995) and Prince Jafar bin Mired (born 4 September 2002).
- Prince Firas bin Ra'ad (born 12 October 1969), married to Dana Nabil Toukan (Now Princess Dana Firas). They have 3 children: Princess Safa bint Firas (born 26 July 2001), Princess Haya bint Firas (born 7 March 2003) and Prince Hashem bin Firas (born 31 October 2010).
- Prince Faisal bin Ra'ad (born 6 March 1975), graduated from Brown University, and married to Lara Sukhtian (Now Princess Lara Faisal). She worked with MSNBC NBC News in Baghdad covering the Iraq War. She's the daughter of Jordanian businessman Munjid Sukhtian. They have 3 children: Prince Hanan bin Faisal (born 3 September 2006), Princess Mariam bint Faisal (born 25 July 2008) and Prince Hussein bin Faisal (born April 2013).
- Princess Fakhrelnissa bint Ra'ad (born 11 January 1981), graduated from Brown University and University College London, and artist known as Nissa Raad. She married in 2005 (divorced 2017). She has 3 children: Radwan Hajjar (born 8 August 2006), Faisal Hajjar (born 14 December 2007) and Lana Hajjar (born 30 April 2012).

In 1970, her husband succeeded his father as the head of the Royal Houses of Iraq and Syria and claimant to the defunct throne of Iraq.

== Charity and philanthropic work ==
In 1971, Majda Ra'ad founded the Al-Hussein Society and served as its president. From 1985 to 1986 she served as the chairwoman of the Board of Occupational Therapy College and worked for the Care of Neurological Patients from 1986 until 1996. She served as the president of Scandinavian Ladies of Amman since 1985 and president of the Jordanian Swedish Friendship Association since 1986. In 1987 she became a member of the Philadelphia Inner Wheel Club. In 1988 she helped found the Petra National Trust. She served as the director of the Bandak Foundation in 1998.

In December 2014, Majda Ra'ad and her husband were patrons of the Embassy of Ukraine in Jordan's Annual Charity Christmas Bazaar.

In October 2015, Majda Ra'ad and her husband participated in a clean up campaign for the Scandinavian Forest in Ain Al Basha.

== Honour ==
- Sweden: Commander Grand Cross of the Order of the Polar Star

== Death and funeral ==
On 3 January 2025, the Royal Hashemite Court announced the death of the princess. In an official statement, the Court said she died in Amman earlier that day. A funeral was held at the Royal Cemetery, following the funeral prayer at the Royal Guards Mosque.
