= Mahamadou =

Mahamadou is a given name. Notable people with the name include:

- Mahamadou Baradji (born 1984), French basketball player
- Mahamadou Danda (born 1951), Nigerien who was appointed as Prime Minister of Niger on 23 February 2010
- Mahamadou Diarra (born 1981), Malian footballer
- Mahamadou Dissa (born 1979), footballer from Mali
- Mahamadou Issoufou (born 1951), Nigerien politician who has been President of Niger since 7 April 2011
- Mahamadou Djeri Maïga (c. 1972–2018), Vice-President of the Transitional Council of the State of Azawad
- Mahamadou N'Diaye (born 1990), Malian footballer
- Habi Mahamadou Salissou, Nigerien politician and a former Secretary-General of the centre-right MNSD
- Mahamadou Sidibé (born 1978), Malian footballer
- Mahamadou Souleymane (born 1984-1986), Tuareg musician
- Mahamadou Traoré (born 1994), Malian professional footballer
- Karidjo Mahamadou, Nigerien politician
- Ouhoumoudou Mahamadou (born 1954), Nigerien politician

== See also ==
- MAMADOU
- Mahama
- Mamadou
