= Ra'ad bin Zeid =

Ra'ad Zeid Al Hashimi رعد بن زيد
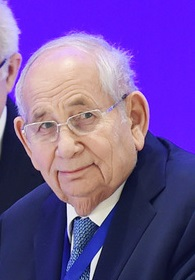
- Ra'ad in 2018

Head of the House of Hashemites of Iraq and Syria
- Tenure: 18 October 1970 – present
- Predecessor: Zeid bin Hussein
- Born: 18 February 1936 (age 90); Berlin, Nazi Germany
- Spouse: Margareta Lind (m. 1963; died 2025)
- Issue: Zeid; Mired; Firas; Faisal; Fakhrelnissa
Names
- Ra'ad bin Zeid Al-Hashimi
- House: Hashemite
- Father: Zeid bin Hussein
- Mother: Fahrelnissa Zeid
- Religion: Sunni Islam

Ra'ad bin Zeid Al Hashimi (Arabic: رعد بن زيد; born 18 February 1936) is the son of Prince Zeid of the Hashemite House and Princess Fahrelnissa Zeid (Fakhr un-nisa or Fahr-El-Nissa), a Turkish noblewoman. His father died on October 18, 1970, leaving him in charge of the former Royal Houses of Iraq. Ra'ad has lived in London and Paris. As a grandson of King Hussein of Hejaz, Ra'ad is also 33rd in the line of succession to the Jordanian throne.

== Early life ==
Raad was born in Berlin, where his father was Iraqi ambassador at the time. He is an agnatic grandson of king Hussein of Hejaz, his father prince Zeid being king Hussein's youngest son. As such he is a first cousin of kings Talal of Jordan and Ghazi of Iraq.

Raad's paternal first cousin once removed was Faisal II, the last king of Iraq, who was killed at the age of 23 in a bloody coup d'état on 14 July 1958 (Crown Prince Abd-al-Illah was also killed). Following the revolution, Prince Zeid, Raad's father, was recognized as the Head of the Royal House of Iraq by his remaining agnatic co-heirs of Jordan. They continued to live in London, where the family resided during the coup, as Zeid was the Iraqi ambassador there.

Raad himself succeeded his father as all such at the latter's death in 1970 in exile in France.

== Education and career ==
He was educated in Alexandria, Egypt, and at Christ's College, Cambridge, where he graduated BA in 1960, promoted to MA in 1963.

After receiving his Cambridge degree, Raad was appointed as Chamberlain of the Royal Court of Jordan, in Amman, and afterwards worked there in civil administration and charitable organizations. He was an aide and a close confidant of his cousins kings Hussein and Abdullah II of Jordan.

== Marriage and children ==
Prince Ra'ad married at Södertälje, Sweden, 30 June 1963 (civil), and at the Royal Palace, Amman, on 5 August 1963, Swedish-born Margaretha Inga Elisabeth Lind, henceforward known as Majda Ra'ad, President of Al-Hussein Society and Director of Bandak Foundation, born in Arboga on 5 September 1942 and died on 3 January 2025, daughter of Sven Gustav Lind and wife Carin Inga Birgitta Gunlaug Grönwall (daughter of Eugen Assar Alexius Grönwall and wife, Signe Maria Svensson, and an illegitimate descendant of the House of Vasa through King Charles XI of Sweden). They have five children:

- Zeid bin Ra'ad (born 26 January 1964), Jordanian diplomat, served as United Nations High Commissioner for Human Rights from 2014 to 2018. He married to Sarah Butler. They have 3 children: Ra'ad bin Zeid (born 17 May 2001), Hala bint Zeid (born 13 March 2003) and Azizah bint Zeid.
- Mired bin Ra'ad (born 11 June 1965), married to Dina Khalifeh. They have 3 children: Shirin bint Mir'ed (born 19 May 1993, married Jafer Mohammed Nabulsi on 4 October 2021), Rakan bin Mir'ed (born 20 November 1995) and Jafar bin Mir'ed (born 4 September 2002).
- Firas bin Ra'ad (born 12 October 1969), married to Dana Nabil Toukan. They have 3 children: Safa bint Firas (born 26 July 2001), Haya bint Firas (born 7 March 2003) and Hashem bin Firas (born 31 October 2010).
- Faisal bin Ra'ad (born 6 March 1975), graduated from Brown University, and married to Lara Sukhtian. She worked with MSNBC NBC News in Baghdad covering the Iraq War. She's the daughter of Jordanian businessman Munjid Sukhtian, of the Sukhtian pharmaceutical business family. They have 3 children: Hanan bin Faisal (born 3 September 2006), Mariam bint Faisal (born 25 July 2008) and Hussein bin Faisal (born April 2013).
- Fakhrelnissa bint Ra'ad (born 11 January 1981), graduated from Brown University in 2002 and University College London in 2004. Artist known as Nissa Raad. She married in 2005 (divorced in 2017). She has 3 children: Radwan Hajjar (born 8 August 2006), Faisal Hajjar (born 14 December 2007) and Lana Hajjar (born 30 April 2012).

== Royal House of Iraq ==
Prince Ra'ad's position as the head of the Royal House of Iraq was in contention with Sharif Ali Bin al-Hussein (a descendant of Hussein of Hejaz's granddaughter, sister and male cousin, but not in male line from king Hussein) who was another pretender to the Iraqi throne and the leader of the Iraqi Constitutional Monarchy, until the latter's death on 14 March 2022.

== Ancestry ==
Hashemites

Hashim (eponymous ancestor)
Abd al-Muttalib
Abu Talib	Abdallah
Muhammad (Islamic prophet)
Ali (fourth caliph)	Fatimah
Hasan (fifth caliph)
Hasan Al-Mu'thanna
Abdullah
Musa Al-Djawn
Abdullah
Musa
Muhammad
Abdullah
Ali
Suleiman
Hussein
Issa
Abd Al-Karim
Muta'in
Idris
Qatada (Sharif of Mecca)
Ali
Hassan (Sharif of Mecca)
Abu Numayy I (Sharif of Mecca)
Rumaythah (Sharif of Mecca)
Ajlan (Sharif of Mecca)
Hassan (Sharif of Mecca)
Barakat I (Sharif of Mecca)
Muhammad (Sharif of Mecca)
Barakat II (Sharif of Mecca)
Abu Numayy II (Sharif of Mecca)
Hassan (Sharif of Mecca)
Abdullah (Sharif of Mecca)
Hussein
Abdullah
Muhsin
Auon, Ra'i Al-Hadala
Abdul Mu'een
Muhammad (Sharif of Mecca)
Ali
Hussein (Sharif of Mecca King of Hejaz)
Ali (King of Hejaz)	Abdullah I (King of Jordan)	Faisal I (King of Syria King of Iraq)	Zeid (pretender to Iraq)
'Abd Al-Ilah (Regent of Iraq)	Talal (King of Jordan)	Ghazi (King of Iraq)	Ra'ad (pretender to Iraq)
Hussein (King of Jordan)	Faisal II (King of Iraq)	Zeid
Abdullah II (King of Jordan)
Hussein (Crown Prince of Jordan)

== Honour ==
- Jordan: Collar of the Order of Al-Hussein bin Ali
- Malaysia: Honorary Commander of the Order of the Defender of the Realm (P.M.N.) (24 April 1965).
- Italian Republic: Knight Grand Cross of the Order of Merit of the Italian Republic (26 November 1983).
- Spain: Knight Grand Cross of the Order of Isabella the Catholic (18 March 1977).
- Sweden: Commander Grand Cross of the Order of the Polar Star

Ra'ad bin Zeid House of Hāshim Born: February 18 1936
Titles in pretence
Preceded by Prince Zeid bin Hussein	— TITULAR — King of Syria and Iraq; 18 October 1970 – present Reason for succession failure: Kingdom abolished in 1920 (in Syria) & 1958 (in Iraq)	Incumbent; Heir apparent: Zeid bin Ra'ad
