= Mohammed Al-Allaf =

Jordanian diplomat (born 1950)

His Excellency Mohammad Fahad al-Allaf
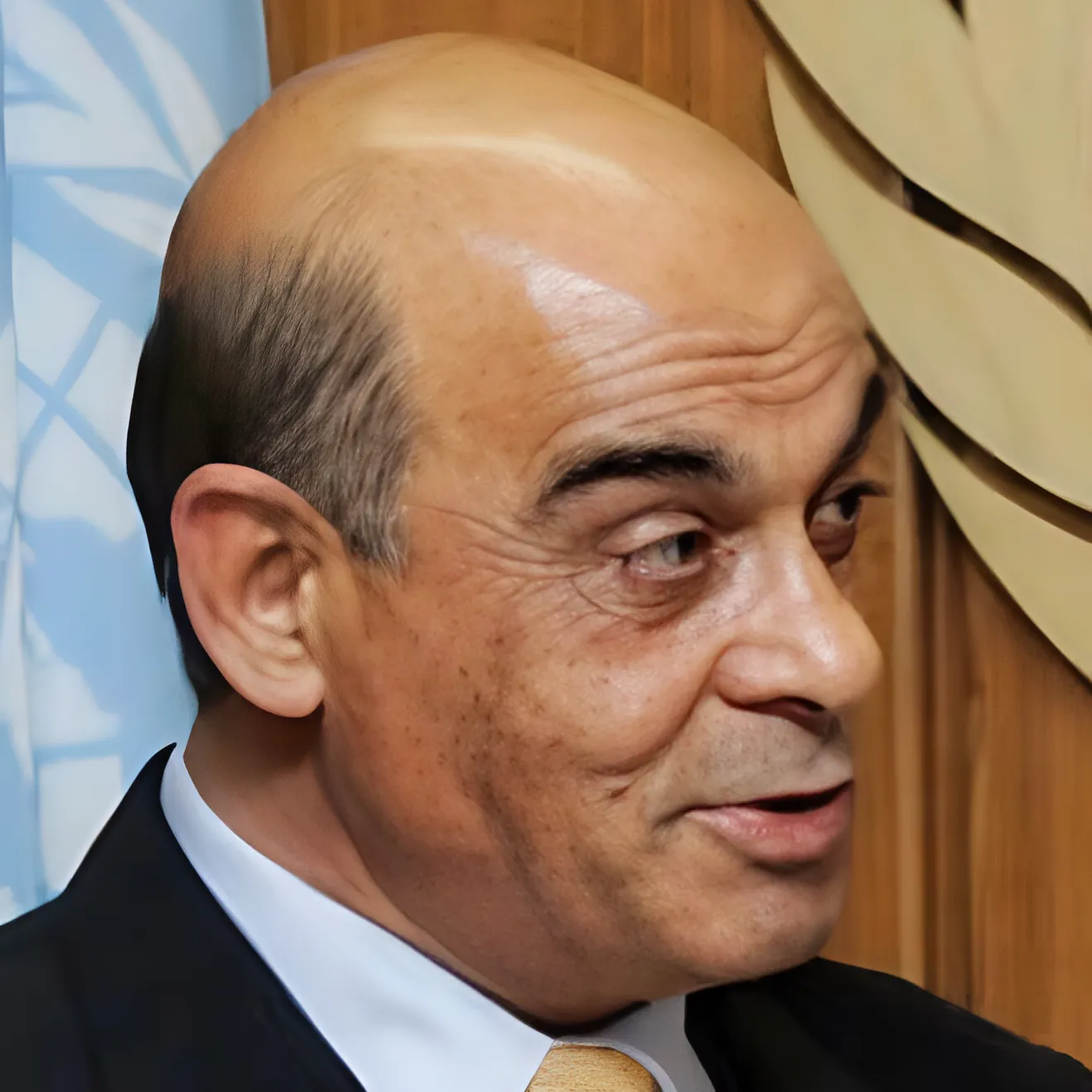
- Al Allaf in 2007

Permanent Representative of Jordan to the United Nations
- In office July 25, 2007 – September 1, 2010
- Preceded by: Zeid bin Ra'ad
- Succeeded by: Zeid bin Ra'ad

Personal details
- Born: 1950 (age 75–76) Amman, Jordan
- Education: Mu'ta University, National Defense University

Military service
- Branch/service: Jordanian Armed Forces
- Rank: Major General
- Commands: Commander of Jordan's military contingent in UNAVEM I and II
- Battles/wars: United Nations Angola Verification Mission (UNAVEM I and II)

Mohammad Fahad al-Allaf (Arabic: محمد فهد العلاف) (born 1950) is a retired major general of the Jordanian Armed Forces and the former Permanent Representative of Jordan to the United Nations. He was appointed to the position on July 25, 2007. Prior to his diplomatic career, al-Allaf had a military career, serving for 38 years, in which he had the role in commanding Jordan's military contingent in the United Nations Angola Verification Mission (UNAVEM I and II).

== Early life and education ==
Al-Allaf was born in Amman, Jordan, in 1950. He pursued his studies at Mu'ta University, where he earned a bachelor's degree in military science. He furthered his education with a master's degree in management and military science from the same institution. He also completed a master's degree in national security strategy from the National Defense University in Washington, D.C.

== Military ==
Al-Allaf began his military career in 1969, when he was commissioned into the Jordanian Armed Forces. His military service spanned over three decades.

=== Roles ===
- Commander of the Jordanian military contingent in the United Nations Angola Verification Mission (UNAVEM I and II) (1989–1991)
- Commandant of the Royal Jordanian National Defence College (2002–2006)
- Assistant Chief of Staff and Chief of Strategic Planning (2006–2007)

== Diplomacy ==
Following his retirement from the military in 2007, Al-Allaf transitioned into diplomacy. On July 25, 2007, he was appointed Ambassador of Jordan to the United Nations.

== Personal life ==
Al-Allaf is married and has five children.
