= Dana Firas =

Jordanian royal

Princess Dana Firas
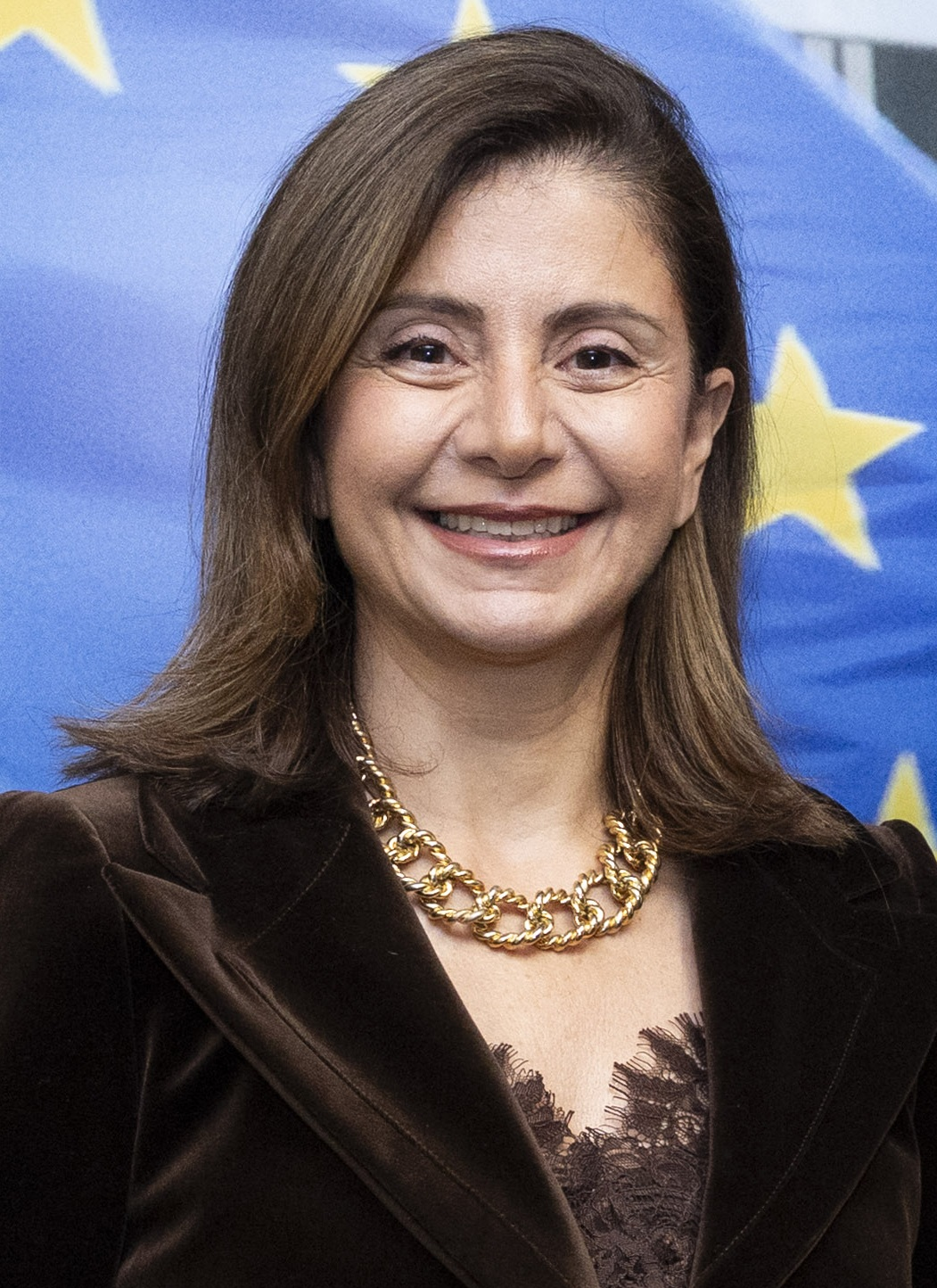
- Firas in 2025
- Born: Dana Nabil Toukan; 27 October 1970 (age 56); Amman, Jordan
- Spouse: Prince Firas bin Ra'ad (m. 1999)
- Issue: Princess Safa; Princess Haya; Prince Hashem
- House: Hashemite (by marriage)
- Father: Nabil Salah Toukan

Princess Dana Firas (née Dana Nabil Toukan; born 27 October 1970) is a Jordanian princess and married to Prince Firas bin Ra'ad. She is a global advocate for heritage protection and preservation as a foundation for sustainable development, identity and peacebuilding.

She serves as the President of the Board of Directors of Petra National Trust. She was named a UNESCO Goodwill ambassador in June 2017 by the UNESCO Director-General Irina Bokova. She presides over the Board of Trustees of the Petra National Trust and is the elected president of the Jordan National Committee of the International Council on Monuments and Sites. She served as an invited expert to the international board of ICOMOS from 2020-2023. In the triennial General Assembly meeting of ICOMOS in Sydney Australia, Princess Dana was formally elected to the board as Vice President. She leads a global effort to integrate culture and heritage in the climate agenda and serves as Special Envoy of the Climate Heritage Network to the Group of Friends of Culture Based Climate Action advocating for culture-based climate action.

== Education and early life ==
Princess Dana was born in Amman, Jordan. She was educated at the Amman Baccalaureate School in Jordan, then earned a BA in International Relations and Economics from Boston University, Magna Cum Laude, an MSc in International Development from the London School of Economics, and an MPA in Public Policy and Development from Harvard University. as a Fulbright Scholar.

== Career ==
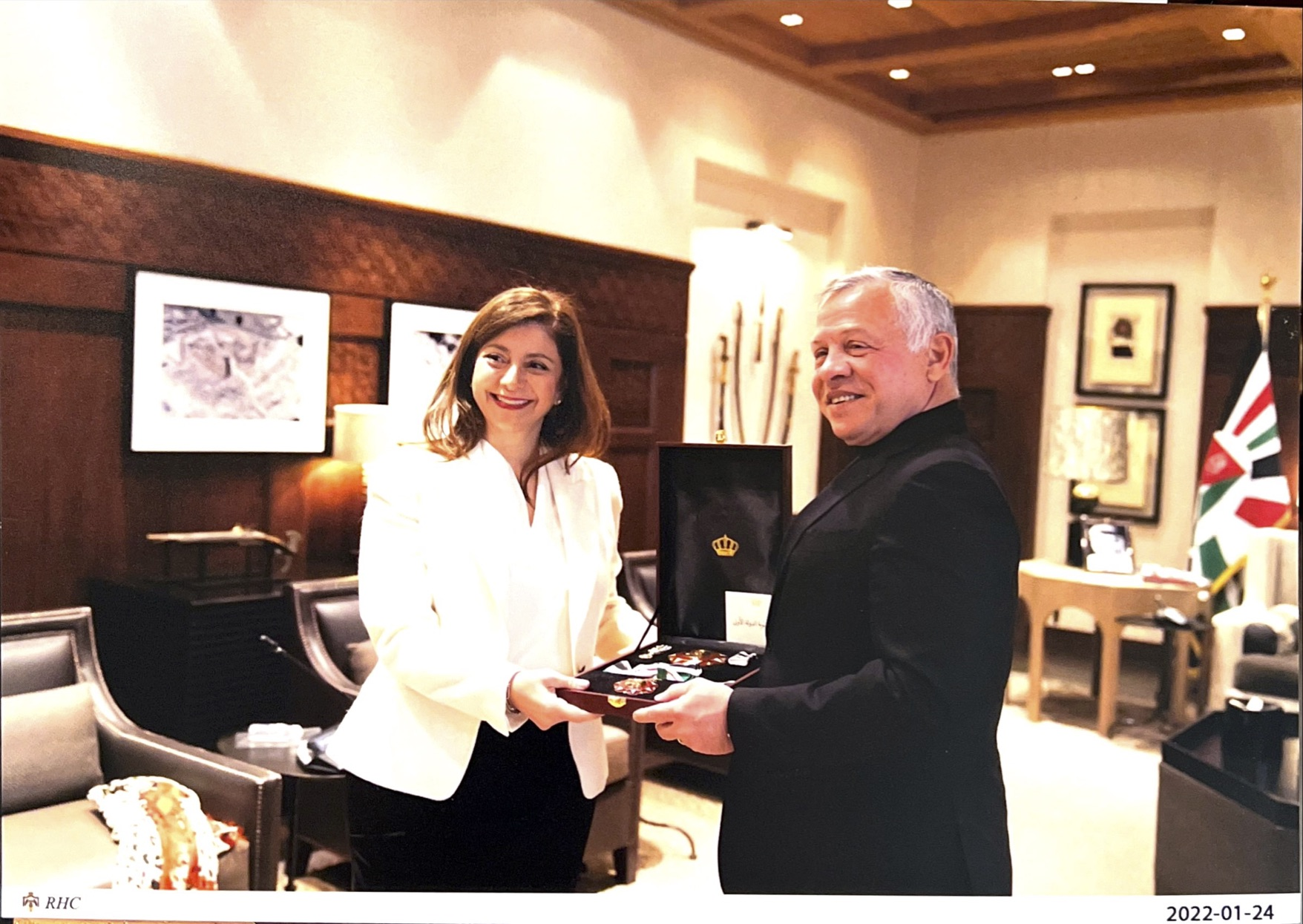
King Abdullah awarding Princess Dana Order of the Centennial

From 1993 to 2000, Princess Dana worked at the Royal Hashemite Court in the Office of Her Majesty Queen Noor on programs that promote sustainable development, environmental protection, women's participation in development, youth health and education, and programs that promote peace and international understanding. In 1999 after the death of His Majesty King Hussein bin Talal of Jordan, Princess Dana participated in the establishment of the King Hussein Foundation, and served as its acting executive until September 2000. While working in the Office of Queen Noor, Princess Dana served as a member of the Steering Committee of the 2000 World Conservation Congress organized by the World Conservation Union (IUCN) and held in Jordan.

In 2016, Princess Dana joined the Board of the Fulbright Commission in Jordan.

In 2023, she became a Trustee of the Turquoise Mountain Foundation.

=== Cultural Heritage Preservation ===
Princess Dana currently serves as President of the Petra National Trust, Jordan's oldest national nongovernmental organization in the field of heritage protection and preservation, established in 1989. The PNT achieves its mission through three main avenues: advocacy, preservation and education, awareness, and outreach. Through her advocacy efforts, Princess Dana works to place cultural heritage at the center of tourism and development policies and programs locally, regionally, and internationally. She has spoken at international conferences throughout the world and contributed to influencing the language of tourism and development to include heritage, culture, and preservation as key components. Princess Dana's efforts have resulted in global partnerships to promote heritage preservation and sustainable tourism.

in 2010, PNT launched an innovative cultural education and awareness program for children, youth, and teachers. The program is designed to empower young leaders to identify with their heritage and become responsible tourism entrepreneurs and committed protectors of Petra's significance and integrity. PNT is the only organization in Jordan and the wider Middle East that successfully offers a substantial, systematic, and structured heritage education program for youth. The program was recognized in 2017 for its innovative and excellent contribution to sustainable tourism at the UNWTO 13th Awards ceremony in Madrid.

Since 2008, Princess Dana has chaired the Board of the Petra National Foundation, a US-based 501-c3 organization working to promote awareness of the world heritage values of Petra and to support projects and programs that protect and preserve the site.

Since the early 1990s, Princess Dana has worked to promote cultural heritage preservation, education, and sustainable development in various capacities in the three sectors: private, public, and civil society, both in Jordan and in the United States. She participated in the establishment of several non-governmental organizations, locally and internationally, to promote heritage preservation and environmental protection.

== Awards and recognition ==
In November 2022, HM King Carl Gustav of Sweden awarded Princess Dana the Royal Order of the Polar Star Commander Grand Cross in recognition of her services to Sweden.

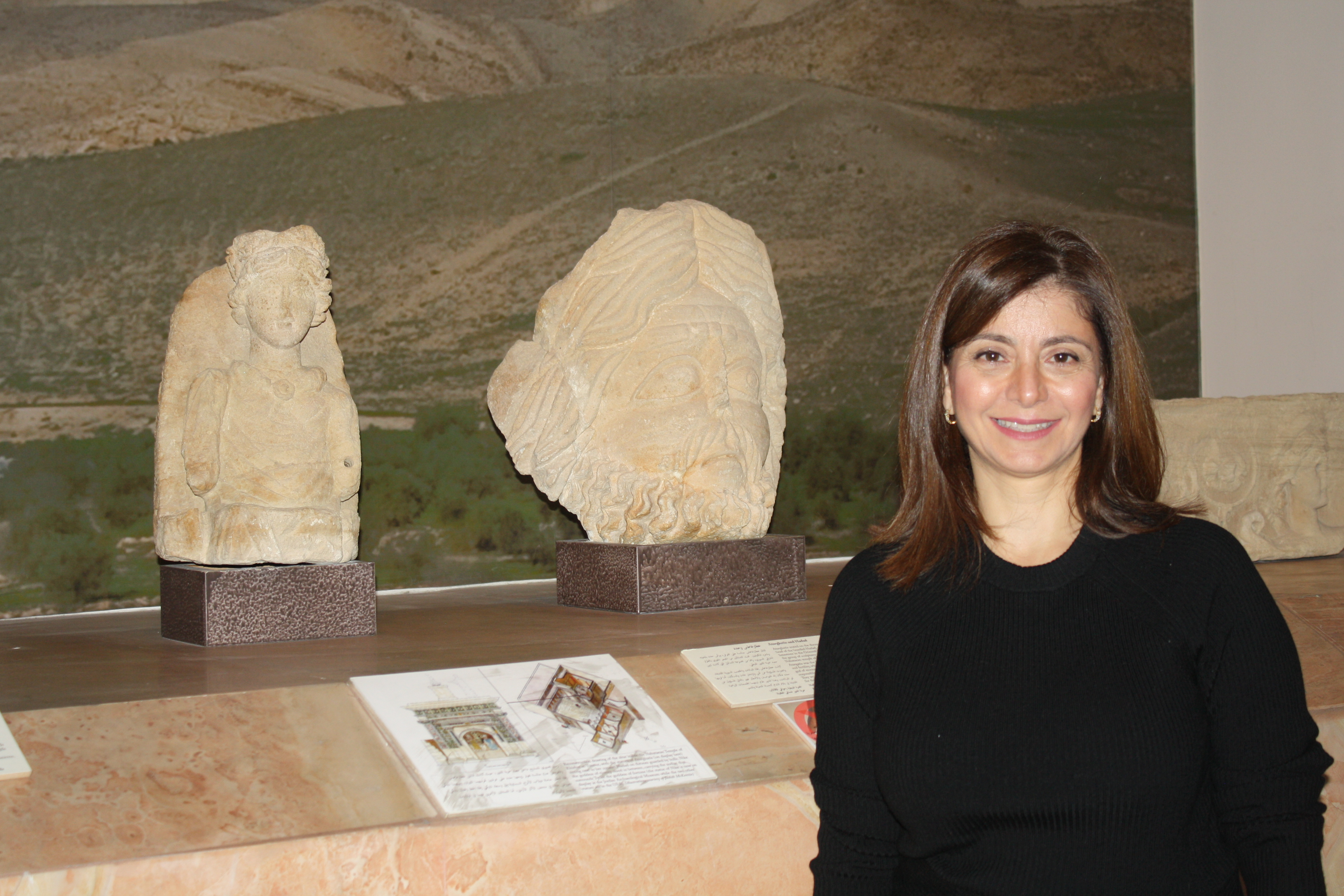
Nabatean reliefs at the Jordan Museum

In January 2022, His Majesty King Abdallah II of Jordan bestowed the Order of the State Centennial on Princess Dana in recognition of her contributions to the field of cultural heritage in Jordan.

In October 2019, Princess Dana received the World Monuments Fund 2019 Watch Award for her contributions to cultural heritage preservation worldwide.

In November 2019, Coventry University bestowed an honorary doctoral degree in literature on Princess Dana for her effective role in cultural heritage preservation and contribution to sustainable development, responsible tourism, and peacebuilding.

In 2018, Dana became the first woman to win the Arab Heritage Person Award.

== Personal life ==
On 7 August 1999, Princess Dana married Prince Firas bin Raad, son of Prince Ra'ad bin Zeid. Prince Ra'ad bin Zeid was the Lord Chamberlain of Jordan until the year 2017. His paternal grandmother was the renowned Turkish painter Princess Fahrelnissa Zeid who was married to Prince Zeid bin Hussein.

Princess Dana and Prince Firas have three children:

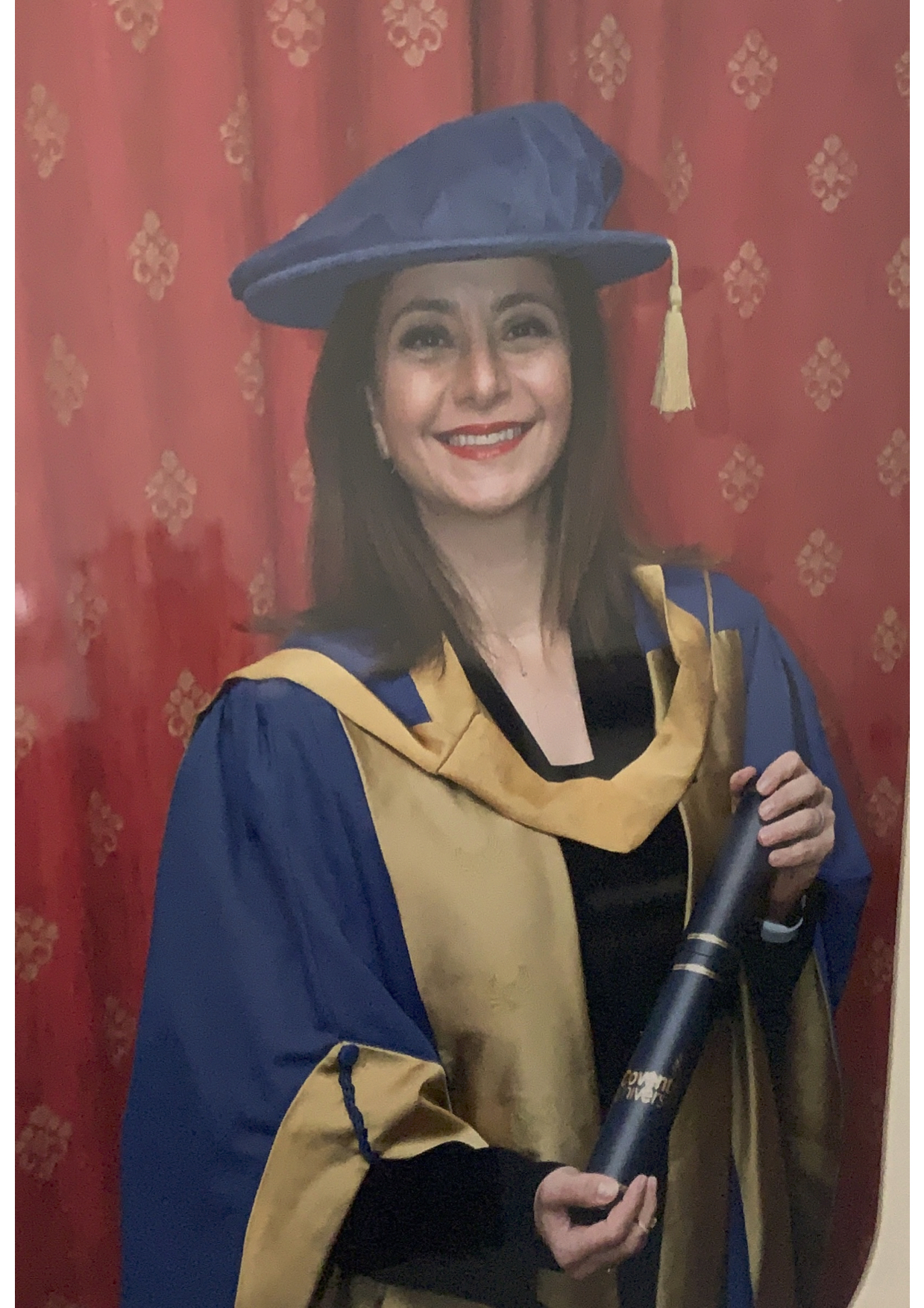
Princess Dana receiving an Honorary Doctorate from Coventry University in 2019

- Princess Safa, born on 26 July 2001 in Amman, Jordan.
- Princess Haya born on 7 March 2003 in Washington, D.C.
- Prince Hashem born on 31 October 2010 in Amman, Jordan.

She lives with her family in Amman, Jordan.

== Publications ==
2022: Princess Dana published a book entitled "Unique and Outstanding: Jordan's World Heritage Sites" with photographer Bashar Tabbah. The foreword to the book was written by UNESCO Director General, Audrey Azoulay.

2015: Princess Dana published an article in the Huffington Post entitled "Goal 18: Global Development Goals and Heritage Preservation."

2012: she contributed to “Tourism and Archeological Heritage Management at Petra: Driver to Development or Destruction.”

2007: She authored a brief article for the 2007 State of the World Report and participated in the launch of the report in Washington, D.C.

2003: Princess Dana co-authored with William C. Clark and Sanjeev Khagram of Harvard University an article entitled “From the Environment and Human Security to Sustainable Security and Development” in the Journal of Human Development.
