= Petra National Trust =

Jordanian non-governmental organization

Petra National trust
- الجمعية الوطنية للمحافظة على البتراء
- Formation: 1989
- Headquarters: Amman, Jordan
- Region served: Petra
- Key people: Princess Dana Firas, President of the Board
- Website: petranationaltrust.org

Petra National Trust (PNT) is a Jordanian nongovernmental organization. Established in 1989, it promotes the preservation, protection, and conservation of the UNESCO World Heritage Site of Petra. PNT has coordinated preservation projects and studies on such issues as the Nabataean hydrological systems, biodiversity, the geophysical stability of the Siq, and the unique Nabataean wall painting at Beidha. It has also implemented projects related to site management and zoning, capacity building for employees of the Petra Archaeological Park (PAP), and the safeguarding of Petra's natural heritage. Princess Majda Ra'ad was one of the trust's founding members.

PNT also works with local communities to raise awareness about the cultural and natural values of Petra. In addition to its fieldwork, the Petra National Trust collaborates with international heritage organizations, academic institutions, and conservation specialists to support research, documentation, and the long-term preservation of Petra's archaeological and natural landscape.
