= Zeid bin Ra'ad =

Jordanian prince and diplomat (born 1964)

Zeid Ra'ad al-Hussein
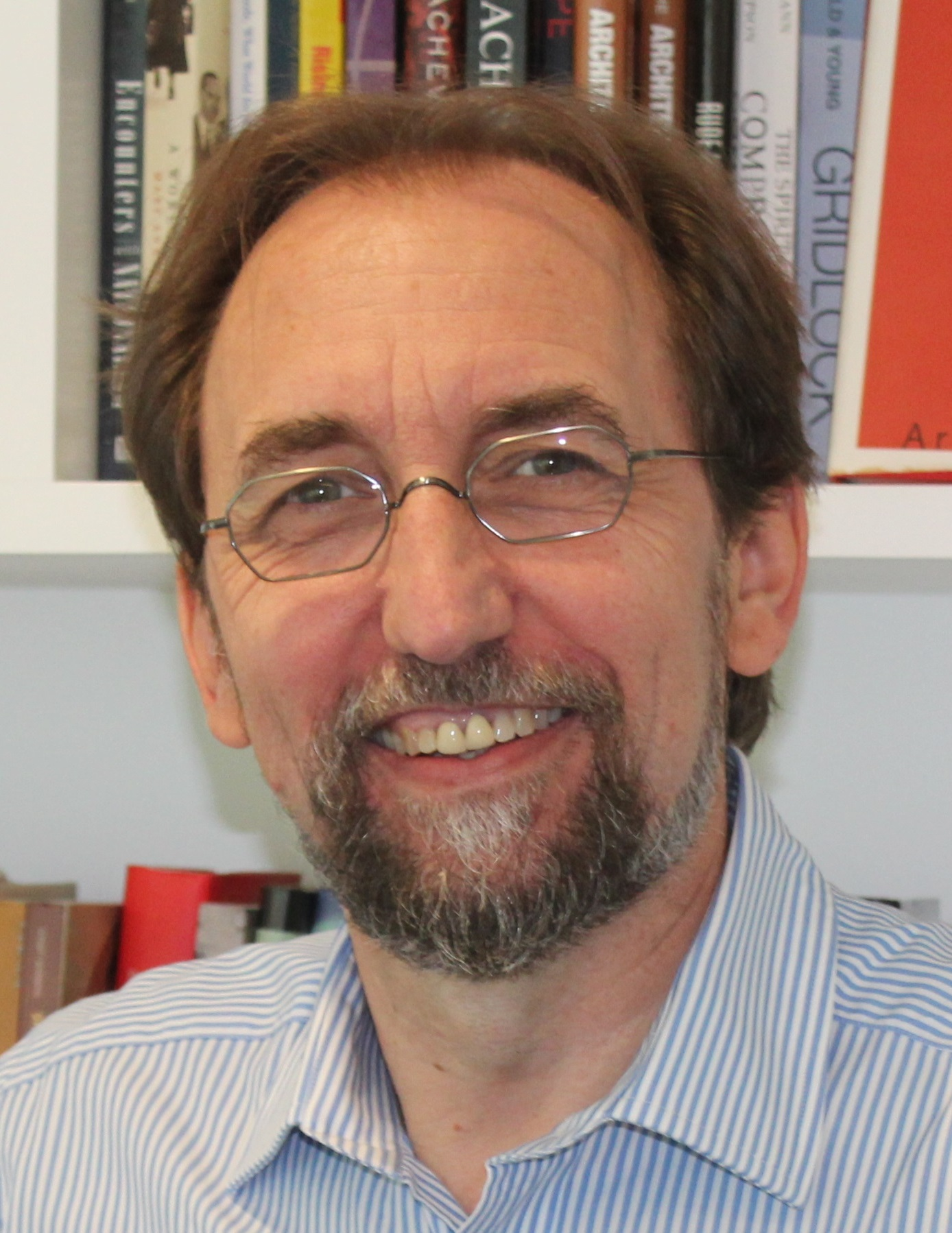
- Zeid in 2019
- Born: 26 January 1964 (age 62); Amman, Jordan
- Spouse: Sarah Butler (m. 2000)
- Issue: 3
- House: Hashemite
- Father: Ra'ad bin Zeid
- Mother: Majda Lind

United Nations High Commissioner for Human Rights
- In office 1 September 2014 – 31 August 2018
- Deputy: Kate Gilmore
- Secretary General: Ban Ki-moon
- Preceded by: Navi Pillay
- Succeeded by: Michelle Bachelet

Permanent Representative of Jordan to the United Nations
- In office September 2010 – 22 July 2014
- Monarch: Abdullah II
- Preceded by: Mohammed Al-Allaf
- Succeeded by: Dina Kawar
- In office 7 August 2000 – 2 January 2007
- Preceded by: Hassan Abu Nimeh
- Succeeded by: Mohammed Al-Allaf

Ambassador of Jordan to the United States
- In office 22 January 2007 – 27 February 2010
- Monarch: Abdullah II
- Preceded by: Karim Kawar
- Succeeded by: Alia Hatough Bouran

President of the Assembly of States Parties of the International Criminal Court
- In office 2002–2004
- Appointed by: Assembly of States Parties
- Succeeded by: Bruno Stagno Ugarte

Prince Zeid bin Ra'ad bin Zeid al-Hussein (Arabic: زيد ابن رعد الحسين; born 26 January 1964) is a Jordanian former diplomat who is the Perry World House Professor of the Practice of Law and Human Rights at the University of Pennsylvania. He is also the president and CEO of the International Peace Institute. He also served as United Nations High Commissioner for Human Rights from 2014 to 2018. He played a central role in the establishment of the International Criminal Court, and was elected the first president of the Assembly of State Parties of the International Criminal Court in September 2002. He also served as a political affairs officer in UNPROFOR in the former Yugoslavia from 1994 to 1996.

A career diplomat, he served as Jordan's Permanent Representative to the United Nations from 2000 until 2007, when he was appointed as Jordan's Ambassador to the United States and non-resident Ambassador to Mexico. He was re-appointed Permanent Representative in 2010 and served until 2014, resigning shortly before his selection as High Commissioner. In 2019, Zeid was invited to join The Elders, an independent group of global leaders working for peace, justice and human rights founded by Nelson Mandela.

He is the son of Prince Ra'ad bin Zeid, Lord Chamberlain of Jordan, and Swedish-born Margaretha Inga Elisabeth Lind, subsequently known as Majda Raad. As the United Nations does not permit the use of royal or other titles by its officials in the context of their official work, he was known as Zeid Ra'ad Al Hussein in his capacity as United Nations High Commissioner. He is the apparent first in line to the thrones of the defunct Kingdom of Iraq and Arab Kingdom of Syria according to the mainstream claim.

== Education and early life ==
Zeid was born in Amman, Jordan. He was educated in the United Kingdom at Reed's School, Surrey, then in the United States at Johns Hopkins University, where he was a member of the university's rugby club and graduated with a B.A. in 1987. He was then a research student at Christ's College, Cambridge, where he gained a PhD in 1993. In 2016, he was made an Honorary Fellow of Christ's College, Cambridge.

Zeid received a commission as an officer in the Jordanian desert police (the successor to the Arab Legion) in 1989 and saw service with it until 1994. He then spent two years as a political officer in UNPROFOR, the UN force in the former Yugoslavia.

== Diplomatic career ==
Zeid served as Jordan's Deputy Permanent Representative to the United Nations from 1996 to 2000. In August 2000 he was appointed Permanent Representative at the United Nations, serving until 2007. In 2006, he was nominated by Jordan as a candidate for selection as the next United Nations Secretary-General. From 2007 to 2010 he was Jordan's Ambassador to the United States of America, then in 2010 returned to the UN as Jordan's Permanent Representative.

In January 2014, Zeid became president of the United Nations Security Council and chaired the Security Council's 1533 and 1521 committees, with regard to two sanctions regimes: the Democratic Republic of the Congo and Liberia.

From 16 September 2010 to 7 March 2012, Zeid was the Chairman of the Country-Specific Configuration of the UN Peace Building Commission for Liberia. He also chaired the search committee for the selection of the second prosecutor of the International Criminal Court in 2011.

With reference to the International Criminal Court, and from 1996 to 2010, he was:

- President of the Assembly of State Parties to the Rome Statute of the International Criminal Court (2002–2005).
- Chairman of the informal negotiations on the 'elements' of the individual offenses falling under the crimes of: Genocide, Crimes Against Humanity, and War Crimes (1999–2000).
- Chairman of the Working Group on the Crime of Aggression at the Review Conference of the Rome Statute in Kampala (June 2010).

Whilst at the UN, he further chaired the Consultative Committee for the United Nations Development Fund for Women (UNIFEM) from 2004 to 2007, and, in 2004, was named Advisor to the Secretary-General on Sexual Exploitation and Abuse in UN Peacekeeping. During his two-year tenure, he issued a report on eliminating such abuse from all peacekeeping operations, which became known as the 'Zeid Report'.

He delivered the Grotius Lecture at the 102nd Annual Meeting of the American Society of International Law in April 2008, entitled For Love of Country and International Criminal Law. He was also a member of the World Bank's Advisory Council for the World Development Report 2011 and the International Advisory Board of the Auschwitz Institute for Peace and Reconciliation.

On 6 June 2014, U.N. Secretary-General Ban Ki-moon proposed that Zeid replace Navi Pillay as the United Nations' human rights chief based in Geneva. The nomination, which was subsequently approved by the 193-nation U.N. General Assembly, made him the first Muslim to lead the UN Human Rights Office. Full texts of all his statements are available at the website of the Office of the High Commissioner for Human Rights. In that capacity he has stated: "There is no justification ever, for the degrading, the debasing or the exploitation of other human beings – on whatever basis: nationality, race, ethnicity, religion, gender, sexual orientation, disability, age or caste."

== United Nations High Commissioner for Human Rights ==
On 8 September 2014, in his maiden speech to the UN's 47-member Human Rights Council at the body's 27th session in Geneva, Zeid strongly criticized the so-called Islamic State group, saying it was trying to create a "house of blood". He called on the international community to combat the spread of the movement in Iraq and Syria, asking, "[Do] they believe they (ISIS) are acting courageously, barbarically slaughtering captives?" The massacres, beheadings, rape and torture "reveal only what a Takfiri (i.e. 'excommunicator' in Arabic) state would look like, should this movement actually try to govern in the future", he said. "It would be a harsh, mean-spirited house of blood, where no shade would be offered, nor shelter given to any non-Takfiri in their midst". In a speech at the US Holocaust Memorial Museum, the Commissioner said that lessons from the Holocaust provide a key to understanding ISIS. He said: "If we have learned anything from our collective history, it is this: Scrambling only for ourselves, our people, our political or religious ideology, or for our own kind will only scramble it all — eventually, sometimes horrifyingly so — for everyone." According to press accounts, he said "The solution he proposed for avoiding atrocities such as the Holocaust was human rights education for every child in the world, beginning before the age of nine. 'In this way, from Catholic parochial schools to the most secular public institutions, and indeed Islamic madrassahs, children could learn — even in kindergarten — and experience the fundamental human rights values of equality, justice and respect.'"

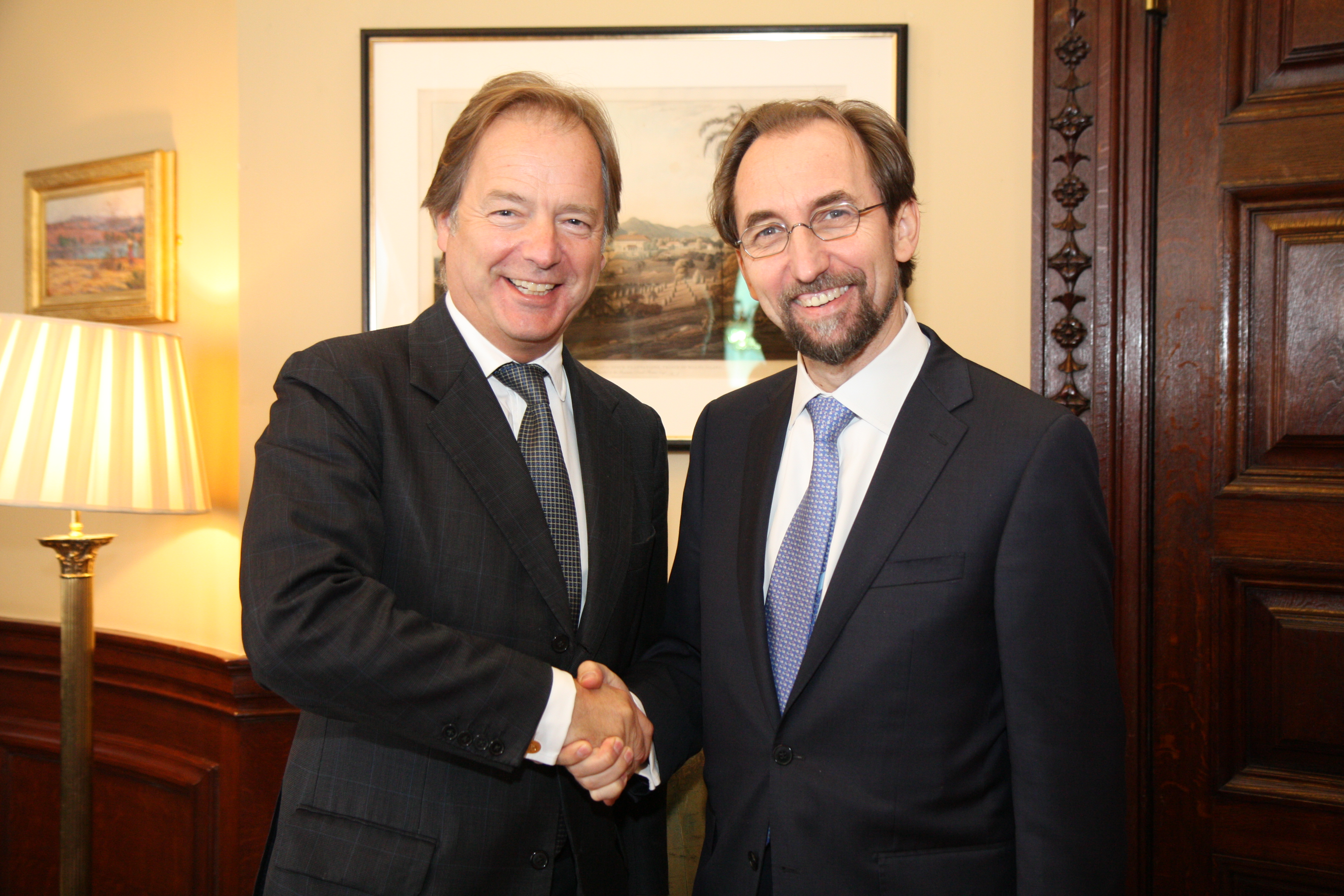
British Foreign and Commonwealth Office Minister Hugo Swire meeting Zeid in London, 12 October 2015

The newly appointed Commissioner also focused on other troubled areas of the world, including Venezuela, Ukraine and Gaza. His press statements are available on the website of his former office.

As Commissioner, the remit of Zeid's position includes the right to criticise those nations’ governments who are monitored and found to abuse human rights. Since these statements concern domestic policy issues of UN member-states, frequent arguments against criticism is that the censure of individual states are close to impinging on state sovereignty.

He has reported to the Security Council on Iraq and other countries, and spoken of the need for greater moral courage to ensure equality and human rights for all: "Children need to learn what bigotry and chauvinism are, and the evil they can produce. They need to learn that blind obedience can be exploited by authority figures for wicked ends. They should also learn that they are not exceptional because of where they were born, how they look, what passport they carry, or the social class, caste or creed of their parents; they should learn that no-one is intrinsically superior to her or his fellow human beings ... Sadly, they must learn that the Zeppelin Field, the shadow of Buchenwald, the glint of the machete and the horror of life today in Syria, Iraq, South Sudan, Central African Republic and elsewhere – wherever we live, they are never that far away."

He said that the United States had an obligation under international law to prosecute all those responsible for CIA torture, from those who carried out interrogations to policy-makers and higher-ups who gave the orders.

On 17 April 2015, Zeid placed the field operations director at the OHCHR, Anders Kompass, under administrative leave after Kompass provided French authorities with an internal UN report detailing sexual abuse of children by French UN peacekeeping troops in the Central African Republic. The decision was reversed on 5 May 2015 after being found "prima facie unlawful" by the United Nations Dispute Tribunal.

On 27 April of that year, Zeid criticized a column in The Sun written by Katie Hopkins for using the term "cockroaches" to refer to migrants, describing it as akin to propaganda used by the Nazis and the perpetrators of the Rwandan genocide against their victims.

In September 2015, Zeid criticized Saudi Arabian-led intervention in Yemen. His report implied that the Saudi-led military coalition may be guilty of war crimes. In October 2016, he said: "The Human Rights Council’s inability to take decisive action by setting up an international investigation is contributing to a climate of impunity, and violations continue to occur on a regular basis. Such outrageous attacks cannot be allowed to continue."

In June 2016, he opined on the United Kingdom's referendum vote on whether to leave the European Union, the so-called Brexit process. Zeid urged UK authorities to take care to prevent xenophobic attacks in the wake of the vote.

In July 2016, Iran executed several Sunni and Kurdish prisoners. Among the prisoners was Hassan Afshar, hanged for allegedly raping another teenage boy when he was 17. Afshar said the relationship was consensual. Zeid strongly criticized the execution of Afshar, calling the death sentence against juveniles particularly abhorrent."

In August 2016, Zeid decried the post-coup purges in Turkey. Zeid said that while he opposed the 2016 Turkish coup d'état attempt, the wide-ranging purges showed a "thirst for revenge" that was alarming.

On 17 August 2016, Zeid expressed deep regret at the failure of UN Human Rights Office to gain access to Kashmir, despite allegations of state sponsorship of violence and the almost daily reports of violence in the region.

In September, the OHCHR was reported as having tweeted angrily against "free market fundamentalism", in the context of Zeid tirades against European and American "populists". Calling Nigel Farage and Donald Trump "demagogues", the Commissioner published attacks on the right-wing politicians in OHCHR's website.

On 12 September 2016, Zeid expressed concern over the presidential campaign of Donald Trump in the United States, whom he described as a "bigot", saying that: "If Donald Trump is elected on the basis of what he has said already ... I think it is without any doubt that he would be dangerous from an international point of view." Zeid said he was "not keen or intent on interfering in any political campaign within any particular country", adding the caveat that when an election could result in an increase in the use of torture (especially waterboarding) "or the focus on vulnerable communities in a way that suggests that they may well be deprived of their human rights, then I think it is incumbent to say so". These attacks on the candidacy of Trump prompted complaints from the Russian government to the UN, with Vitaly Churkin (Russia's Ambassador to the UN) saying: "Prince Zeid is overstepping his limits from time to time and we’re unhappy about it. He criticized a number of heads of state, government. He should stick to his file, which is important enough."

Zeid was condemned by Filipino President Rodrigo Duterte in December 2016 for suggesting an investigation into Duterte's own accounts of extrajudicial killings when he was still Mayor of Davao City and on the "shocking" deaths linked to the Philippine drug war. Duterte spokesperson Harry Roque responded by saying "Perhaps, the UN High Commissioner's language is because of the fact that they do not have democracy in his home state of Jordan. Jordan's leader is not elected unlike our president.

By the time he ended his service as High Commissioner, one journalist reported that because Zeid was famously blunt and spared no one, his speeches and statements were eagerly awaited by the Geneva press corps. This endeared him to human rights activists worldwide.

In response to the death of Chinese Nobel Peace Prize laureate Liu Xiaobo, who died of organ failure while in government custody, Zeid said in a statement that "The human rights movement in China and across the world has lost a principled champion who devoted his life to defending and promoting human rights, peacefully and consistently, and who was jailed for standing up for his beliefs."

In 2019, he was appointed Honorary Knight Commander of the Order of St Michael and St George (KCMG), for services to the promotion and protection of human rights.

Also in 2019 Zeid was inducted into the American Academy of Arts and Sciences.

== Honours and awards ==
On 27 May 2020, Zeid Raad Al Hussein was invited to and gave special remarks at his alma mater Johns Hopkins University's 2020 Commencement ceremony. Other notable guest speakers during the virtual ceremony included Reddit co-founder and Commencement speaker Alexis Ohanian; philanthropist and former New York City Mayor, Michael Bloomberg; Anthony Fauci, director of the National Institute of Allergy and Infectious Diseases and a leading member of the White House Coronavirus Task Force; and senior class president Pavan Patel.

== Personal life ==
HH Prince Zeid is the son of Prince Ra'ad bin Zeid, Lord Chamberlain of Jordan. His paternal grandmother was the Turkish painter Princess Fahrelnissa Zeid who was married to Prince Zeid bin Hussein.

Zeid was married on 5 July 2000 in Amman to Sarah Butler, known as Princess Sarah Zeid after her marriage, who was born in Houston, Texas, on 1 August 1972. She is the daughter of Dr Godfrey Butler, a British geologist and a consultant to international oil companies, and Jean H. Butler.

Zeid's younger brother, Mired bin Ra'ad, is the Chairman of the National Commission for Demining and Rehabilitation of Jordan, and Special Envoy of the Convention on the Prohibition of the Use, Stockpiling, Production and Transfer of Anti-Personnel Mines and on Their Destruction, or Ottawa Treaty, which seeks to eliminate the use of landmines.

Zeid bin Ra'ad House of Hāshim Born: 26 January 1964
Titles in pretence
Preceded by Ra'ad bin Zeid; Disputed by Sharif Ali bin al-Hussein	— TITULAR — Line of succession to the former Iraqi throne Reason for succession failure: Kingdom abolished in 1958; Iraqi Constitution of 1943 restricts succession to Iraqi nationals Right of succession disputed between relatives of the last king of Iraq	Succeeded by Prince Ra'ad II bin Zeid
