= Adila Khanum =

Spouse of Hussain bin Ali, Sharif of Mecca (1879–1929)

Queen consort of Hejaz
- Tenure: 10 June 1916 – 3 October 1924
- Born: Khadija Adila; 1879; Constantinople, Ottoman Empire
- Died: July 1929 (aged 49–50); Larnaca, Cyprus
- Burial: Hala Sultan, Umm Haram, Tekke, Cyprus
- Spouse: Hussein bin Ali, King of Hejaz (m. 1895; died 1929)
- Issue: Prince Zeid; Princess Sara
- House: Hashemite (by marriage)
- Father: Salah Bey

Adila Khanum (1879 – July 1929) was a Turkish woman who was the third spouse of Hussein bin Ali, Sharif of Mecca, King of Hejaz between 1916 and 1924.

== Biography ==
Adila Khanum was born in Constantinople 1879. She was a daughter of Salah Bey and a granddaughter of Mustafa Rashid Pasha, who was a Grand vizier of the Ottoman Empire.

In 1895 she married Hussein bin Ali when he was in exile in Constantinople. She was the third spouse of Hussein bin Ali. They had two children: Prince Zeid and Princess Sara. Their son, Prince Zaid, married Turkish painter Fahrunissa Zeid.

Through Adila Khanum's father Hussein bin Ali developed close relations with the leading figures of Ittihat ve Terakki Cemiyeti during his exile in Constantinople until 1908 when he was appointed Sharif of Mecca. Adila Khanum together with Princess Sara and Princess Saliha, daughter of Hussein bin Ali with his second wife, Mediha, accompanied her husband in his exile to Cyprus in 1925. She died at age 50 in Larnaca, Cyprus, in July 1929 and buried there at the Hala Sultan, Umm Haram, Tekke. Following her death Hussein bin Ali's mental and physical health became much worse, and he died in 1931.

This is her epitaph:

This is the grave of the deceased Khadija Adila, granddaughter of the late Reshid Pasha, Grand Vizier formerly and wife of His Majesty Hussein bin Ali, King of the Hejaz. She died on the island of Cyprus on 4th of Safar, the generous year 1348 of the Hegira.
