= Dina Mired =

Jordanian royal and health advocate

Princess Dina Mired
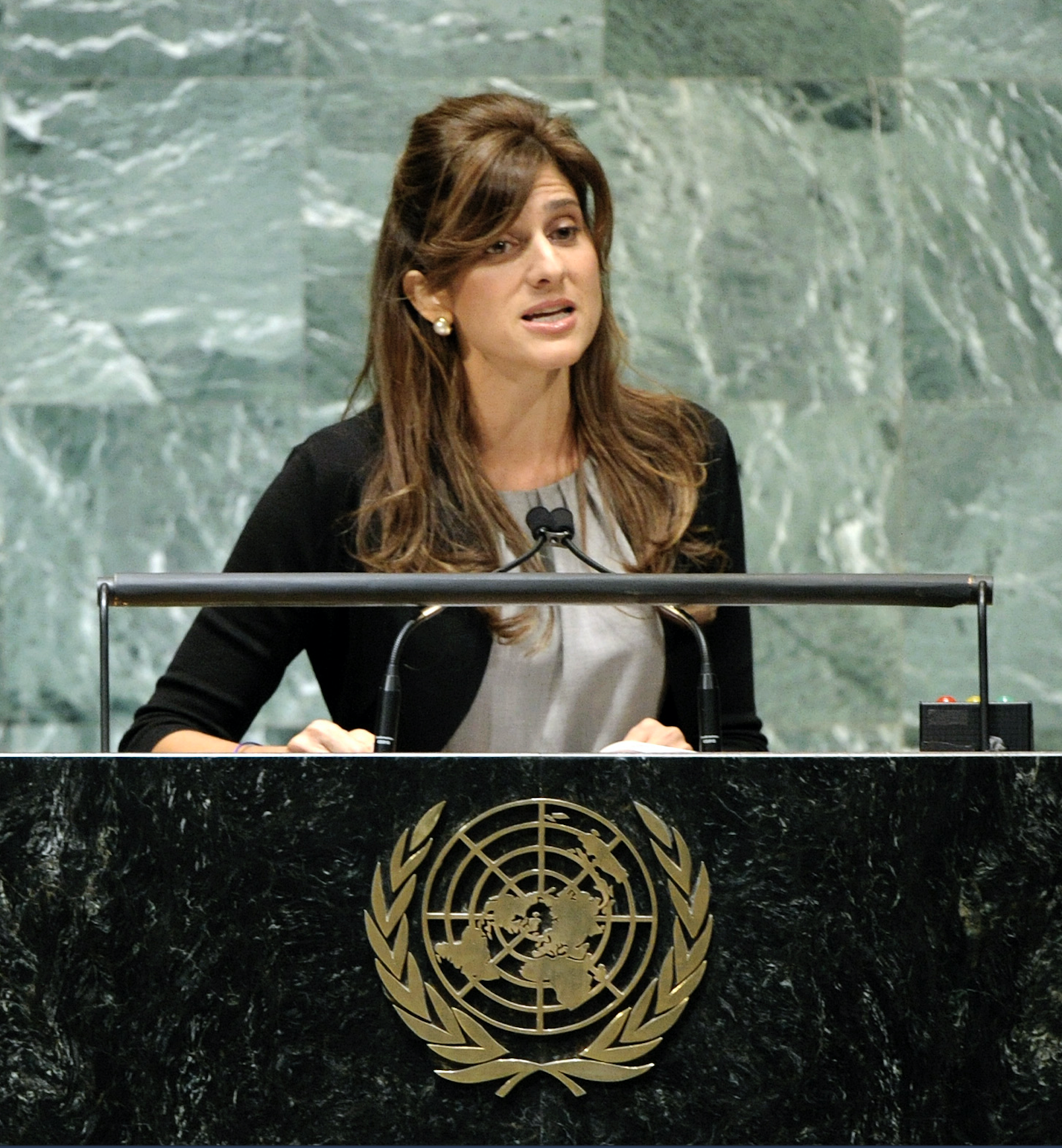
- Mired speaking at the United Nations General Assembly in 2017
- Born: Dina Mohammad Khalifeh; 12 October 1965 (age 60); Amman, Jordan
- Spouse: Prince Mired bin Ra'ad (m. 1992)
- Issue: Princess Shirin; Prince Rakan; Prince Jafar
- House: Hashemite (by marriage)
- Father: Mohammad Khalifeh

Princess Dina Mired (born Dina Mohammad Khalifeh on 12 October 1965) is a Jordanian royal and global health advocate, particularly in the field of cancer control and non-communicable diseases (NCDs). She served as President of the Union for International Cancer Control (UICC) from 2018 to 2020 and was Director-General of the King Hussein Cancer Foundation.

She delivered the keynote speech at the opening of the United Nations General Assembly's first high-level meeting on NCDs in September 2011 and spoke at the third high-level meeting on NCDs in September 2018.

== Education ==
Princess Dina holds a BSc in Accounting and Financial Analysis from Warwick University, England (1985–1988), and an MSc from Reading University, England (1991).

== Career ==
Princess Dina was elected president of the Union for International Cancer Control (UICC), the largest global cancer-fighting organization, in 2018. She was the first Arab to hold this position. Prior to her presidency at UICC, she served as a Member of the UICC Presidential Advisory Panel, and as an Ambassador of the UICC World Cancer Declaration Ambassadors Program.

She was the Director General of the King Hussein Cancer Foundation (KHCF) from 2002 until June 2016, where she focused on research, development, advocacy, cancer coverage, patient support, and public awareness on early detection and prevention.

=== Local and Global Advocacy for Cancer Control ===
Since 2006, Princess Dina has served as the Honorary Chairperson of the Jordan Breast Cancer Program (JBCP). She also advocates against tobacco use, both in Jordan and globally.

Other roles held by Princess Dina include:

- Member of the Expert Group for the Elimination of Cervical Cancer Initiative.
- Honorary Ambassador of Harvard Global Health Win-Win initiative.
- Member of WHO Civil Society Working Group on Non-Communicable Diseases (NCDs).
- Global Ambassador for Tobacco Free Portfolios.
- Honorary Member of the Mediterranean Task Force for Cancer Control in Italy.
- Honorary President of Harvard University Global Task Force for Expanded Access to Cancer Control and Care in the Developing World (2009–2013).
- Ambassador for the Global Smoke-free Worksite Challenge.
- Member of the advisory board of NCD child.

== Awards and honors ==
- 2018: Awarded the Arab Woman of the Year Award for "Achievements in Global Leadership in Cancer Control" by the London Arabia organization.
- 2018: Conferred an honorary doctorate by the Medical University of Asunción-Paraguay, in recognition of her global efforts in the fight against cancer.
- 2017: Awarded the "Female of the Year 2017- Golden Award for Excellence" by the Arab Women Council, in recognition of outstanding efforts in the field of social responsibility in the Arab World.
- 2016: Conferred an honorary doctorate by Yerevan State Medical University (YSMU) in Armenia, in recognition of global efforts in the fight against cancer.
- 2016: Chosen for Susan G Komen's first-ever More than Pink list.
- 2016: Awarded "Personality of the 2016 in the fight against breast cancer" by the Zahra Breast Cancer Association of Saudi Arabia.
- 2015: Recipient of the International Agency for Research on Cancer (IARC) Medal of Honor.

== Publications ==
- "The Challenges of Providing Access to Cancer Care: Jordan, A Success Story From the Heart of the Developing World". Cancer Control: Cancer Care in Emerging Health Systems, 2013.
- "Why Are We So Meek in Demanding Treatment for Non-Communicable Diseases?". Huffington Post, 2012.
- "Paying a Heavy Price". Deloitte ME, ME POV, issue 3.2010.
- Farmer, P., Frenk, J., Knaul, F. M., Shulman, L. N., Alleyne, G., Armstrong, L.,... Seffrin, J. R. (2010). Expansion of cancer care and control in countries of low and middle income: A call to action The Lancet, 376 (9747), 1186–1193. doi:10.1016/s0140-6736(10)61152-x
- "World No Tobacco Day...where are we now? Reflections through the smoke screen". Global Bridges Blog, 2014.
- "Fighting the other cancer... the cancer of shame", Ammon News, July 2013.

== Personal life ==
Princess Dina married Prince Mired bin Ra'ad, the son of Prince Ra'ad bin Zeid and Princess Majda Ra'ad. They have three children: Princess Shirin (born 19 May 1993, married to Jafer Mohammed Nabulsi on 4 October 2021), Prince Rakan (born 20 November 1995), and Prince Jafar (born 4 September 2002). After her son, Rakan, was diagnosed with leukemia in 1997, she was inspired to advocate for cancer research, control, and prevention.
