= Karim Kawar =

Businessman and former Jordanian ambassador

His Excellency Karim Kawar
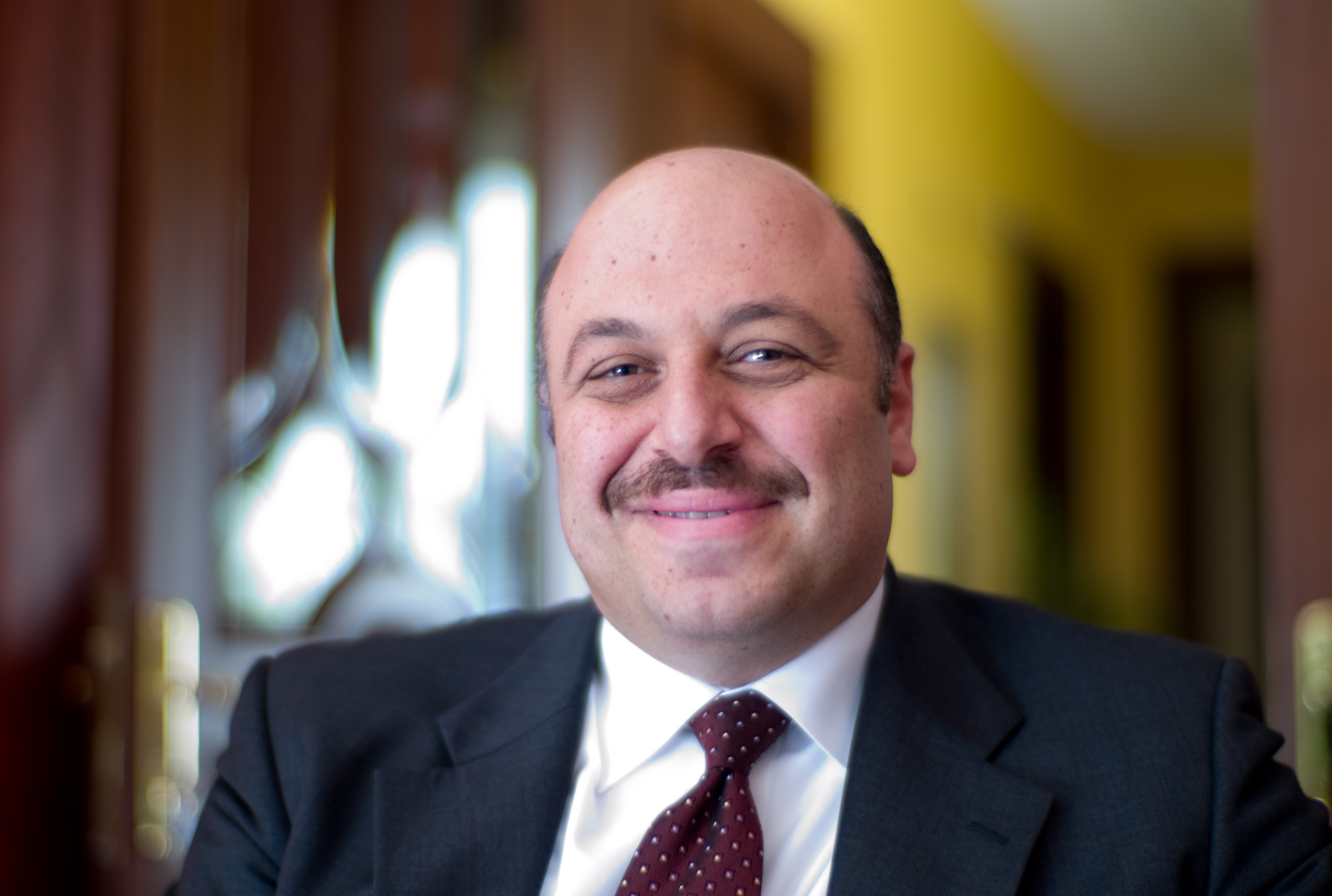

17th Jordan Ambassador to the United States
- In office 1 July 2002 – 15 January 2007
- Preceded by: Marwan Jamil Muasher
- Succeeded by: Prince Zeid bin Ra'ad

Personal details
- Born: 15 June 1966 (age 60) Amman, Jordan
- Spouse: Luma Halazon
- Children: Faisal, Abla, Alia
- Education: Boston College
- Occupation: President of Kawar Group

Karim Kawar (Arabic: كريم قعوار) is a Jordanian businessman and the former ambassador to the United States from Jordan, where he served under the title of Ambassador extraordinary and plenipotentiary of the Hashemite Kingdom of Jordan to the United States of America and the Republic of Mexico from July 2002 until January 2007.

== Early life ==
Kawar grew up in Amman, Jordan. He graduated from Boston College, in 1987 with a BSc in management, finance and computer science. There he also met his wife, Luma Halazon. At the age of twenty, Kawar established his first company and headed an umbrella group that encompassed ten information systems and software companies.

== Diplomacy ==
From 2002 to 2007, Kawar served under the title of Ambassador extraordinary and plenipotentiary of the Hashemite Kingdom of Jordan to the United States of America and the Republic of Mexico. Kawar was one of the youngest of Jordan's ambassadors, who at the time of his appointment had been involved in developing Jordan's information and communications technology sector. Kawar was succeeded by Prince Zeid Ra'ad Zeid al-Hussein, returning to his home country of Jordan.

== Business ==
Kawar was appointed, in 1999, as a member of the Economic Consultative Council, by King Abdullah II. The Economic Consultative Council was the first 21-member body that included public and private sector leaders established to advise the Monarch on economic and social issues. Kawar served as a member of several Consultative Council task forces on Investment, eGovernment, Public Sector Reform, and computer and English education.

In 1999 led a team of 40 Jordanian IT professionals under the REACH Initiative to develop a strategy to launch the IT industry in Jordan. Kawar also served as Chairman of the Information Technology Association of Jordan (INTAJ), and before that as President of the Jordan Computer Society. Kawar was selected as a Young Global Leader by the World Economic Forum and was also selected as an Eisenhower Fellow for the year 2000. He is a founding member of several business associations and NGOs, among which are the American Chamber of Commerce in Jordan (AmCham), the Young Entrepreneurs Association (YEA) and the Jordanian Intellectual Property Association (JIPA). He is also a member of the Young Presidents' Organization (YPO).

Kawar also served as Vice Chair and later a member of the board of the Jordan River Foundation, chaired by Queen Rania. Kawar also served as the Network Coordinator of the United Nations Information and Communication Technologies Task Force - Arab Regional Network.Kawar and his wife Luma, formed Bridges of Understanding Foundation, a nonpolitical nonprofit organization with the stated aim of supporting projects and initiatives that foster better understanding between the people of the US and the people of the Arab and Muslim world, starting with women of the U.S. and Jordan.

On 21 September 2010, The King's Academy Board of Trustees announced the appointment of Karim Kawar as chairman of the board, following the resignation of Founding Chairman Professor Safwan Masri. In 2007 Kawar rejoined the Jordan-based Kawar Group of Companies as its president. The Kawar Group was founded by his grandfather. His brother Rudain is the CEO.Kawar also is the Chairman of IrisGuard, Inc., which specializes in the deployment of iris recognition systems for border and homeland security. He is a principal shareholder and advisor to Optimiza Solutions, a provider of management consulting, technology enablement and outsourcing services in the Middle East.
