= Centres Against Sexual Assault =

Rape crisis centres in Victoria, Australia

The Centres Against Sexual Assault (CASAs) are non-profit, government-funded rape crisis centres in Victoria, Australia. Sexual Assault Services Victoria (SASVic, formerly CASA Forum) is the umbrella body for CASAs.

The first Centre Against Sexual Assault was established at Melbourne's Royal Women's Hospital in the mid-1990s under the leadership of Kate Gilmore. As of 2009, it was the country's largest network of its sort.

CASAs provide support and intervention to anyone who is a victim/survivor of sexual assault, as well as providing advocacy and education services.

== See also ==
- Feminist movement
