= Sarah Zeid =

Jordanian-American humanitarian and activist

Princess Sarah Zeid
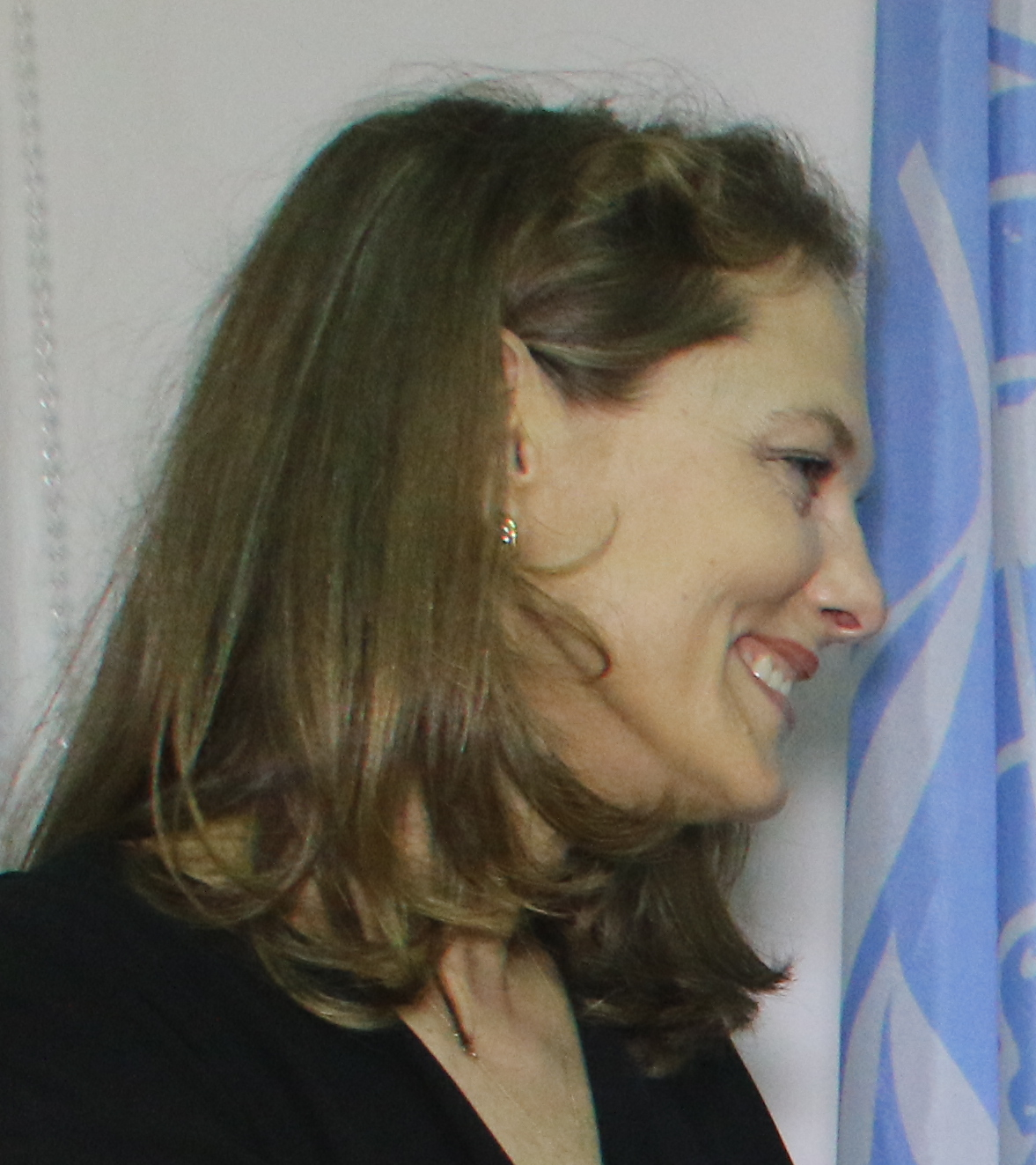
- Born: Sarah Antonia Butler; 1 August 1972 (age 54); Houston, Texas; United States
- Spouse: Zeid bin Ra'ad (m. 2000)
- Issue: 3
- House: Hashemite
- Father: Godfrey Phillip Butler
- Mother: Jean Hamilton

Princess Sarah Zeid (born Sarah Antonia Butler on 1 August 1972) is a Jordanian-American humanitarian and maternal & newborn health activist. Through her marriage to Prince Zeid bin Ra'ad al-Hussein, she is a Jordanian princess and a member of the House of Hashem. Her husband is the heir apparent to the pretender to the abolished throne of Iraq.

== Early life and education ==
Princess Sarah was born as Sarah Antonia Butler on 1 August 1972 in Houston, Texas to Dr. Godfrey Phillip Butler, a British petroleum geologist and consultant to international oil companies, and Jean Hamilton Butler. She has a Bachelor of Arts degree in international relations from the University of St. Thomas and a master's degree in development studies from the University of London's School of Oriental and African Studies.

== Career ==
Princess Sarah is a global health advocate whose work focuses on maternal and newborn health. She has worked in the United Nations Department of Peacekeeping Operations and served as the Desk Officer for Iraq in the Office of Emergency Programmes at UNICEF. She has been a contributor to Peace TV. She is a steering committee member of the Every Newborn Action Plan and partners with PATH to promote the recommendations made by the United Nations Commission for Lifesaving Commodities for Women and Children. She is a patron of the White Ribbon Alliance for Safe Motherhood and an advisory board member for the Women's Rights Division at Human Rights Watch. Princess Sarah is the founder and co-chair, along with Kate Gilmore, of Every Woman Every Child Everywhere which, as the EWEC Strategy and Global Goals are implemented, focuses on the prioritization of and innovation for reproductive, maternal, newborn, child, and adolescent health in humanitarian and fragile settings. She is a board member of the Women's Refugee Commission and a member of the UNHCR Advisory Group on Gender, Forced Displacement and Protection.

In September 2013 she gave a speech at the Every Woman Every Child reception at the UN General Assembly, highlighting the work of Colalife.

Princess Sarah participated in a panel discussion hosted by the United Nations Foundation and McCann at the 2015 Lions Health Festival in Cannes. She also visited hospitals in Nadi and Lautoka while on a trip to Fiji on behalf of EWEC. During her tour of Fiji, she addressed the Pacific Technical Experts and Ministerial Consultation on Strengthening Climate Change through Reproductive, Maternal, Newborn, Child and Adolescent Health at the Sofitel Resort and Spa in Nadi. In October 2015 she promoted the adoption of the 2030 Global Goals, a sustainable development agenda by the United Nations.

In October 2016 Princess Sarah visited the Kigali Genocide Memorial as a Goodwill ambassador of the United Nations High Commissioner for Refugees to honor the victims of the 1994 Rwandan genocide against the Tutsi. Afterward, she visited the Burundian refugee camp in Mahama, Kirehe District, and gave a speech. Following her visit, she was part of a consultation between the government of Rwanda and the UNHCR regarding the status of Burundian refugees.

In September 2017, Princess Sarah was the keynote speaker at an event hosted by the Human Rights Council in Geneva that focused on the provision of sexual reproductive health services in conflict and post-conflict situations. She spoke of her role as the lead for the humanitarian work-stream of the Global Strategy for Women's, Children's and Adolescents’ Health and how to empower women and children. In November 2017 she delivered the keynote at Nutrition: Cornerstone of Gender Equality, a conference in Ottawa, Canada on nutrition's role in achieving gender equality. In her keynote speech, she acknowledged how the implementation of the Feminist International Assistance Policy has contributed to Canada's position on the national stage regarding women's and girl's rights. During her Canadian visit, she also attended a parliamentary gathering hosted by Pam Damoff, organized with Results Canada and Nutrition International. On 24 October 2017, Princess Sarah attended The Center for Reproductive Rights' 25th anniversary celebration in New York City. On 4 December 2017, Princess Sarah did a two-day tour in Juba, South Sudan. While in Juba she visited several refugee camps, an orphanage of the NGO Children out of Conflict, and the Protection of Civilians Site 3, a site for internationally displaced people.

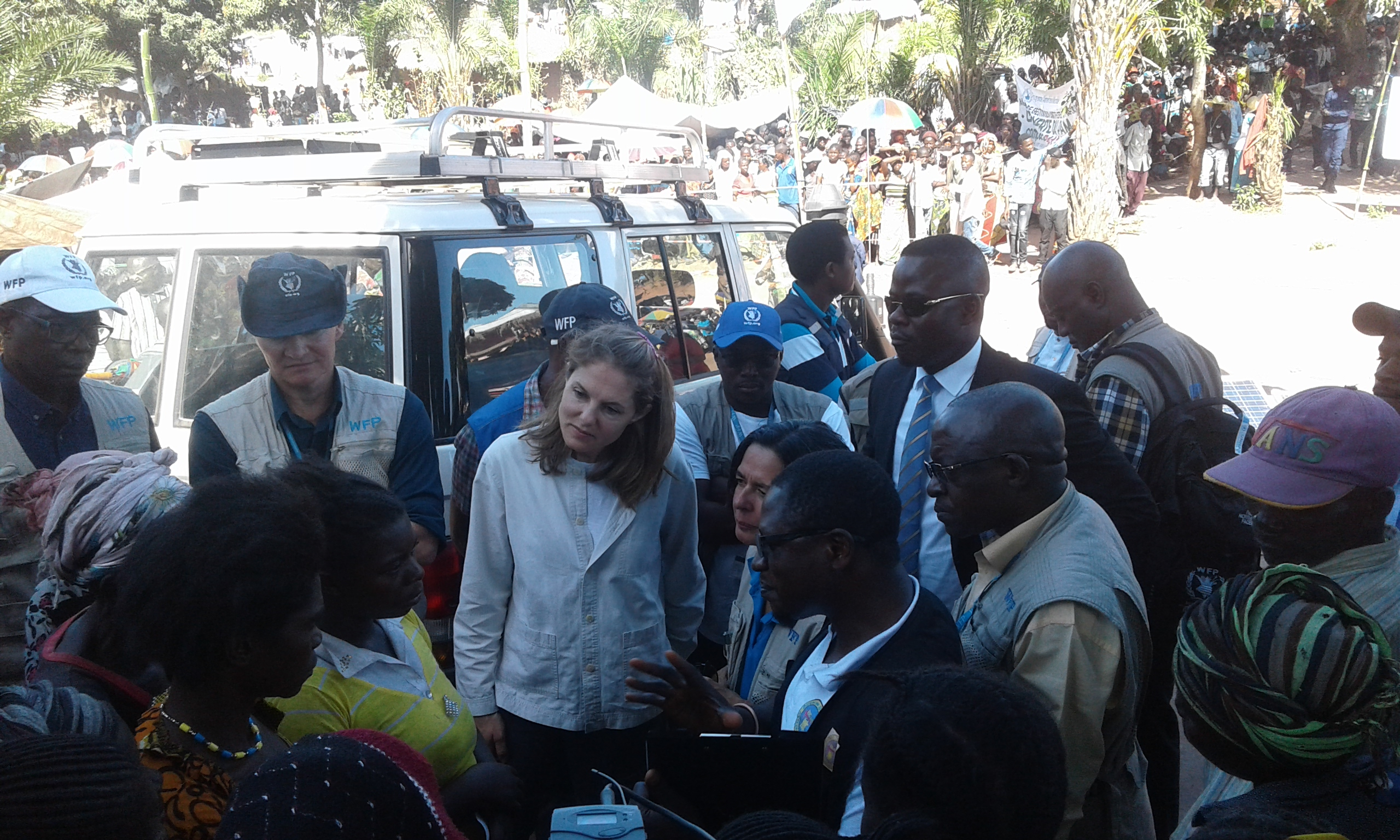
Princess Sarah as Goodwill Ambassador of the World Food Programme, in Kalemie, Democratic Republic of the Congo, 2018.

In 2018 Princess Sarah became a program ambassador for Women Deliver, a global advocacy group. In June 2018 Princess Sarah conducted a three-day visit to Burundi where she met with the First Lady of Burundi, top government officials, and partners with the World Food Programme.

== Personal life and views ==
She married U.N. Commissioner on Human Rights Prince Zeid bin Ra’ad Zeid al-Hussein, a Jordanian prince and claimant to the throne of Iraq as a relative of King Faisal II, on 5 July 2000 in Amman. As a pretender of the Iraqi throne, her husband claims the title of Crown Prince of Iraq. Princess Sarah and Prince Zeid bin Ra’ad Zeid al-Hussein have three children. After the birth of her third child, Princess Azziza, Princess Sarah suffered an amniotic fluid embolism. She had little chance of survival but recovered.

Princess Sarah has stated that her passion for health advocacy comes from her personal experience as a mother.

In May 2014, Princess Sarah spoke in support of a woman's right to an abortion, stating that if women are ostracized for their reproductive health choices then the causes of unwanted pregnancies will not be understood, and that misinformation and a lack of resources can relate to unsafe abortions. She also spoke out against the Syrian conflict and the health crisis it has caused.
