= Mired bin Ra'ad =

Member of the Hashemite dynasty

Prince Mired bin Ra'ad bin Zeid
- Chief Royal Councillor
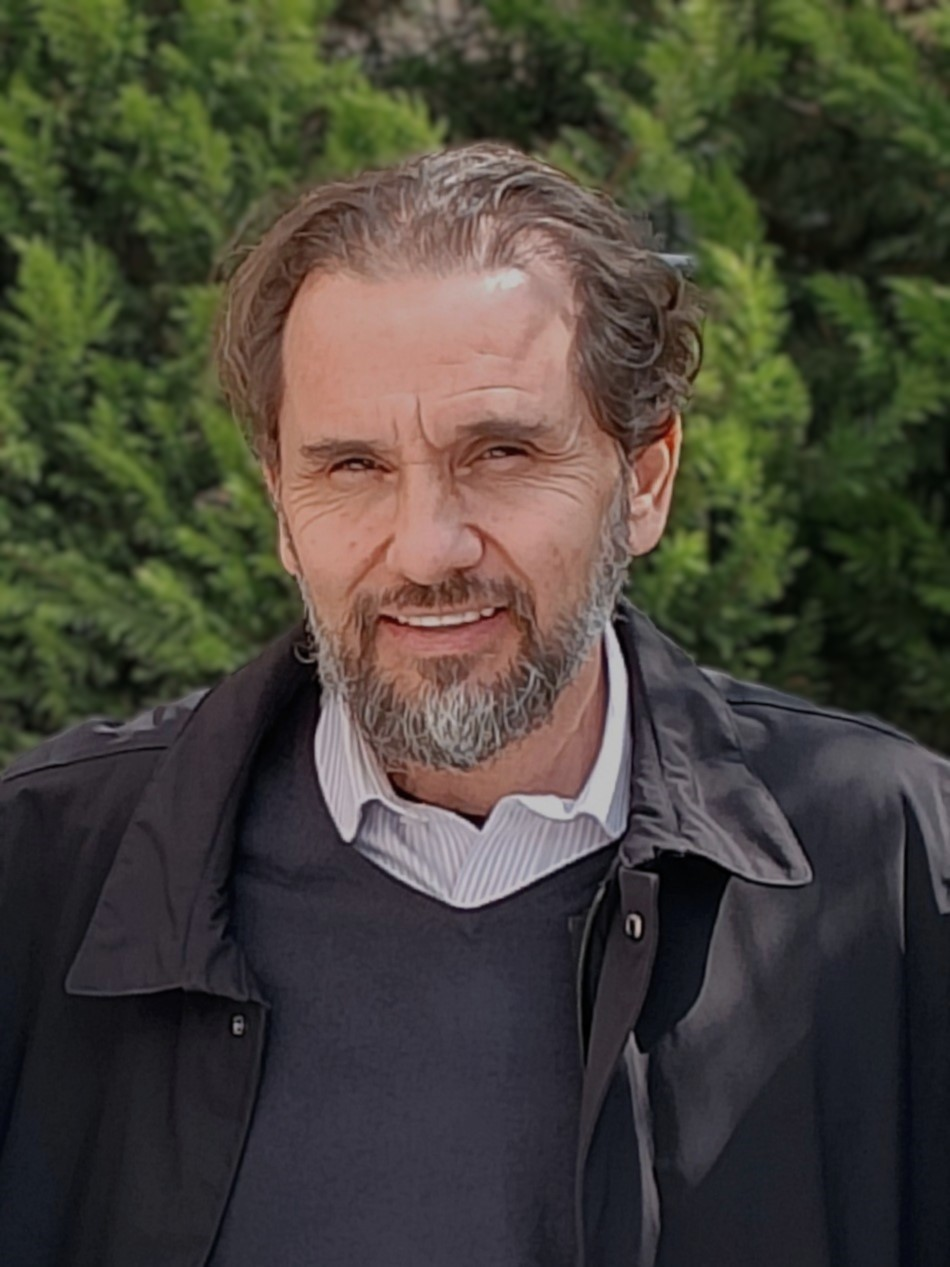
- Prince Mired bin Ra'ad of Jordan on March 5, 2025

Chief Royal Councillor at the Royal Hashemite Court
- Reign: 28 February 2021 – present

Head of the Higher Council for the Affairs of Persons with Disabilities
- Reign: 21 April 2014 – present
- Predecessor: Prince Ra'ad bin Zeid

President of the National Committee for Demining and Rehabilitation
- Reign: 2008 – present
- Born: Mired bin Ra'ad bin Zeid Al-Hussein (Arabic: مرعد بن رعد بن زيد الحسين); 11 June 1965 (age 61); Amman, Jordan
- Spouse: Dina Mohammad Khalifeh (m. 1992)
- Issue: Princess Shirin bint Mired; Prince Rakan bin Mired; Prince Jafar bin Mired
- Dynasty: Hashemite
- Father: Prince Ra'ad bin Zeid
- Mother: Margaretha Inga Elisabeth Lind (Majda Ra'ad)
- Religion: Sunni Islam
- Education: Tufts University (BA, 1987); University of Cambridge (MA, 1988); Royal Military Academy Sandhurst (1990); The Fletcher School of Law and Diplomacy, Tufts University (1995)

Prince Mired bin Ra'ad bin Zeid Al-Hussein (Arabic: مرعد بن رعد بن زيد; born June 11, 1965, in Amman, Jordan) is the second son of Prince Ra'ad bin Zeid, head of the royal houses of Iraq and Syria, and his Swedish-born wife, Margaretha Inga Elisabeth Lind, known post-marriage as Majda Ra'ad. On February 28, 2021, a Royal Decree has been issued appointing him as chief royal councillor and Deputy Chief of the Royal Hashemite Court.

Prince Mired has dedicated his life to public service. Since 2014, he has led Jordan’s Higher Council for the Rights of Persons with Disabilities, ensuring compliance with the CRPD. He also serves as President of the National Committee for Demining and Rehabilitation. In 2008, he chaired the Eighth Meeting of the States Parties to the Ottawa Treaty and has since continued as a Special Envoy for the Mine Ban Treaty, promoting global landmine bans in countries like Laos, the U.S., China, and South Korea.

== Early life and education ==
Mired bin Ra'ad is the second son of Prince Ra'ad bin Zeid, Lord Chamberlain of Jordan, and his Swedish-born wife Margaretha Inga Elisabeth Lind, subsequently. He studied at the beginning of his school life in Jordan, and studied the first grades at the National Orthodox School.

He pursued higher education at Tufts University, Medford, Massachusetts, earning a degree in 1987. Furthering his studies, he obtained a master's degree in philosophy and historical studies from the University of Cambridge in 1988. His commitment to service led him to the Royal Military Academy Sandhurst in the United Kingdom, from which he graduated in 1990. Prince Mired then returned to Tufts University, attending The Fletcher School of Law and Diplomacy, where he graduated in 1995.

== Personal life ==
On July 1, 1992, in Amman, HH Prince Mired bin Ra'ad married Dina Mohammad Khalifeh. Together, they have three children. Their eldest daughter, Princess Shirin bint Mired, was born on May 19, 1993 in Amman. She married Jafer Mohammed Nabulsi on October 4, 2021 in a Katb El-Kitab ceremony held at Prince Mired bin Ra'ad’s home. Their first son, Prince Rakan bin Mired, was born on November 20, 1995 in Amman, followed by their youngest son, Prince Jafar bin Mired, who was born on September 4, 2002 in Amman.

Princess Dina Mired is a former Director General of the King Hussein Cancer Foundation and remains actively involved in cancer control efforts, particularly in the developing world.

Prince Mired's older brother, Prince Zeid, served as the United Nations High Commissioner for Human Rights from September 2014 until 2018.

== Career ==
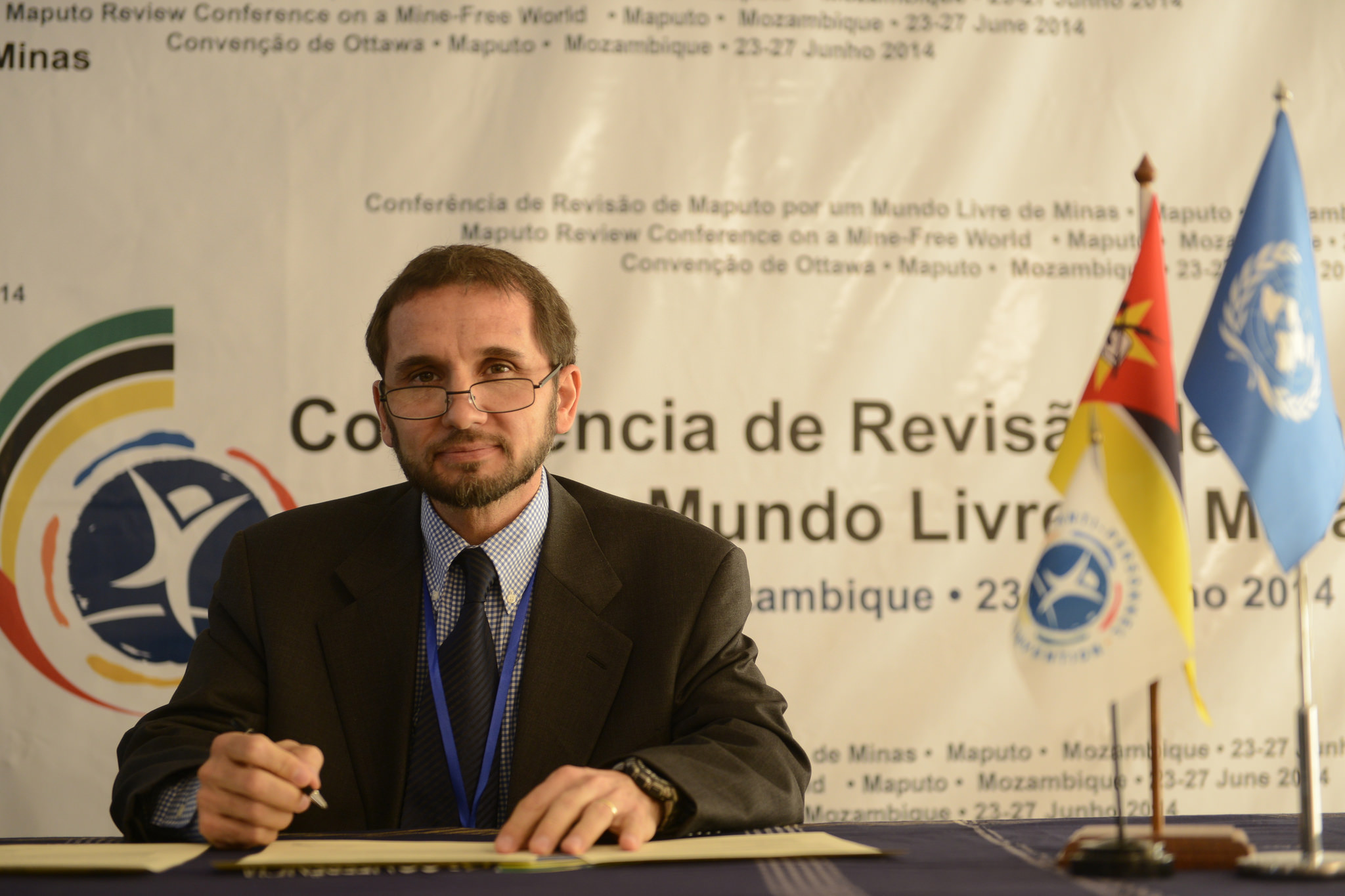
Prince Mired signs the Maputo Declaration for a Mine-Free World in Mozambique, February 28, 2016.

A Royal Decree issued on April 21, 2014, appointed Prince Mired as Head of the Higher Council for the Rights of Persons with Disabilities (succeeding Prince Ra'ad bin Zaid Chief Chamberlain). As such, he has publicly addressed Jordan’s obligations towards persons with disabilities according to its obligations under the Convention on the Rights of Persons with Disabilities. He is also Chairman of the National Commission for Demining and Rehabilitation of Jordan. As Head of the Hashemite military patients, he also served as Vice President of the Supreme Council for the Affairs of Disabled Persons.

=== Leadership roles ===
Prince Mired holds leadership positions in several key organizations in Jordan. As the head of the Hashemite Commission for Injured Military Personnel, he supports Jordanian military veterans who have suffered injuries in service. He also leads the Higher Council for the Affairs of Persons with Disabilities. Additionally, he chairs the Jordanian Paralympic Committee. That's why he promote sports and opportunities for disabled athletes. Furthermore, he oversees landmine clearance operations and supports affected communities through his leadership in the National Committee for Demining and Rehabilitation.

=== Advocacy for Landmine Ban ===
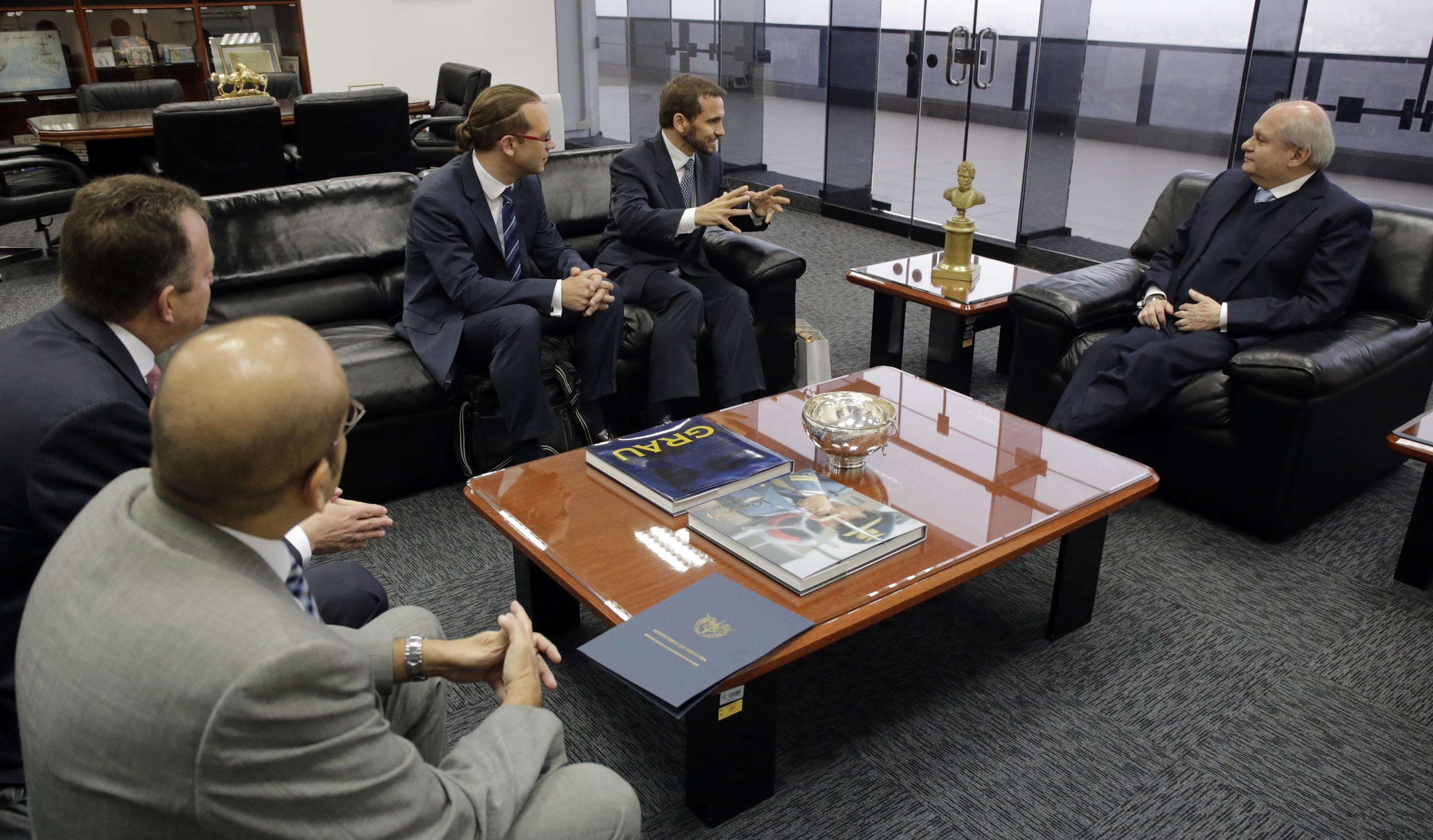
Minister of Defense Pedro Cateriano welcomes Prince Mired on a protocol visit as Special Envoy for the Universalization of the Anti-Personnel Mine Ban Convention – June 23, 2012.

In 2008, Prince Mired presided over the Eighth Meeting of the States Parties to the Convention on the Prohibition of the Use, Stockpiling, Production and Transfer of Anti-Personnel Mines and on Their Destruction, or Ottawa Treaty, which took place in the Dead Sea. In that position he visited Finland to promote the Convention and its norms—meeting with Foreign Minister Alexander Stubb,—and Poland, which at the time where still not members of the Ottawa Treaty.

As he ended his mandate, the Prince was asked to represent efforts to promote said Convention becoming Special Envoy.

As Special Envoy, Prince Mired promotes a universal ban against landmines and support for its victims. His missions have taken him to the United States (2010) where he met with Samantha Powers. That year, he also met with Mongolia's Prime Minister S. Batbold.

In 2011, he visited South Korea, and the Polynesian Kingdom of Tonga where he encountered the Prime Minister who is also Minister of Foreign Affairs & Defence Lord Tu'ivakano, and Tuvalu where he met with Prime Minister Willy Telavi, and, Minister of Foreign Affairs Apisai Lelemia. In 2013 he travelled to China to meet with then Vice Minister of Foreign Affairs Li Baodong and other authorities at the Ministry of Defence.

In 2018, he toured Sri Lanka meeting with President Maithripala Sirisena, Prime Minister Ranil Wickremesinghe, Minister of Foreign Affairs Tilak Marapana, Minister of Prison Reform in charge of mine action Deva Manoharan Swaminathan, among others. That same year, he carried a mission to Myanmar to promote the ban, meeting with Minister of International Cooperation U Kyaw Tin and Minister of Defence Lt. Gen. Sein Win. In Laos, he also met with Minister of Foreign Affairs Saleumxay Kommasith, Vice Minister of Foreign Affairs Thongpane Savanphet; Minister of Defence Lt. Gen. Chansamone Chanyalath; Minister of Labour and Social Welfare Khampheng Saysompheng; and Prime Minister Thongloun Sisoulith.

In 2019, together with Princess Astrid of Belgium, and Haakon, Crown Prince of Norway, they kicked off a global meeting on landmines, in Oslo, Norway where the landmine treaty had been adopted two decades years earlier.

== Honours ==
=== Foreign honours ===
- Sweden: Commander Grand Cross of the Order of the Polar Star (15 November 2022).
