= Ibrahim Mahama =

Ibrahim Mahama may refer to:

- Ibrahim Mahama (artist) (born 1987), Ghanaian artist
- Ibrahim Mahama (businessman) (born 1971), Ghanaian businessman

== See also ==
- Ibrahim Mahama Atiku (born 1986), Ghanaian footballer
- Ibrahim Makama Misau, Nigerian politician
