= List of kings of Iraq =

King of Iraq
- ملك العراق
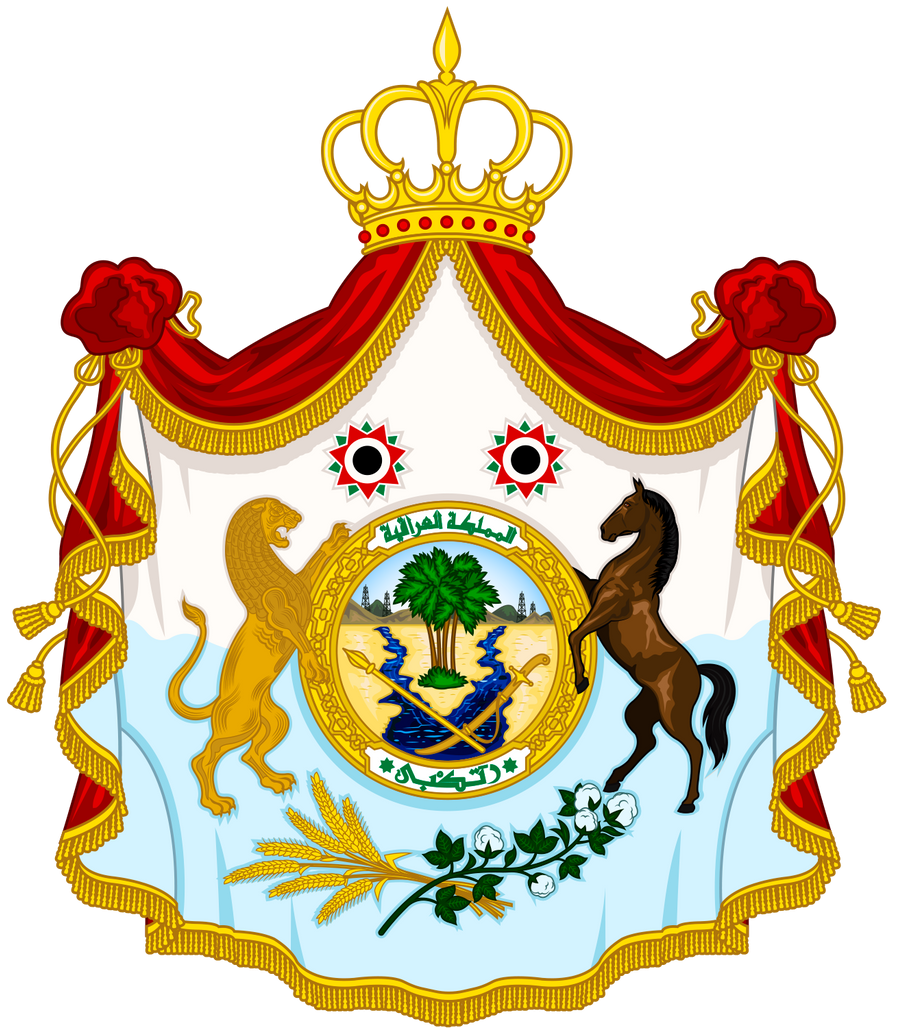
- Arms of His Majesty the King of Iraq

- Last to reign: Faisal II; 4 April 1939 – 14 July 1958

Details
- Style: His Majesty
- First monarch: Faisal I
- Last monarch: Faisal II
- Formed: 23 August 1921
- Abolished: 14 July 1958
- Residences: Royal Palace, Baghdad
- Appointer: Hereditary
- Pretender: Ra'ad bin Zeid

The king of Iraq (Arabic: ملك العراق, romanized: Malik al-‘Irāq) was Iraq's head of state and monarch from 1921 to 1958. He served as the head of the Iraqi monarchy—the Hashemite dynasty. The king was referred to as His Majesty (Arabic: صاحب الجلالة).

== History ==
In the aftermath of World War I and the dissolution of the Ottoman Empire, the three provinces (vilayets) of Ottoman Iraq came under the control of the United Kingdom. Under British occupation, the Iraqi Revolt broke out and the country showed itself a hard land to govern. In order to establish a pro-British client state, a dynasty of Hashemite kings from the Hejaz region was established, beginning with Faisal I who was the son of Hussein bin Ali. As a family originating in the Hejaz, the Hashemites was foreign to Iraq. The British Government appointed them as Iraq's royal family after a plebiscite in 1921. The Hashemites were largely opposed by the Iraqi Shias and Kurds. The Kingdom of Iraq existed until an Iraqi nationalist coup d'état in 1958 known as the 14 July Revolution established the First Republic of Iraq.

== King-designate of Iraq (1920) ==
Name	Lifespan	Reign start	Reign end	Notes	Family	Image
Abdullah: عبد الله الأول بن الحسين	2 February 1882 – 20 July 1951 (aged 69)	1920	1920	Designated by Cairo Conference. Never took throne. Son of Hussein bin Ali	Hashemite	Abdullah I of Jordan

== Kings of Iraq (1921–1958) ==
Name	Lifespan	Reign start	Reign end	Notes	Family	Image
Faisal I: فيصل الأول	20 May 1883 – 8 September 1933 (aged 50)	23 August 1921	8 September 1933	Previously King of Syria for a short period in 1920. Brother of Abdullah	Hashemite	Faisal I of Iraq
Ghazi I: غازي الأول	21 March 1912 – 4 April 1939 (aged 27)	8 September 1933	4 April 1939	Son of Faisal I	Hashemite	Ghazi I of Iraq
Faisal II: فيصل الثاني	2 May 1935 – 14 July 1958 (aged 23)	4 April 1939	14 July 1958 (deposed and executed)	Son of Ghazi I	Hashemite	Faisal II of Iraq

== Royal standard ==
Royal Standard of the King

== See also ==
- Mesopotamia
  - List of Mesopotamian dynasties
- List of Assyrian kings
- List of kings of Akkad
- List of kings of Babylon
- Regent of Iraq
- President of Iraq
  - List of presidents of Iraq
- List of Sunni dynasties
