= Office of the United Nations High Commissioner for Human Rights =

UN Secretariat department that promotes human rights under international law

- Abbreviation: OHCHR; HCDH
- Formation: 20 December 1993
- Type: Agency
- Legal status: Active
- Headquarters: Geneva, Switzerland; New York City, United States
- Head: Volker Türk (High Commissioner for Human Rights)
- Employees: 1,368 (2022)
- Website: ohchr.org

The Office of the United Nations High Commissioner for Human Rights (Note: Commonly known as the Office of the High Commissioner for Human Rights or the United Nations Human Rights Office.) (OHCHR) is a department of the United Nations Secretariat that works to promote and protect human rights that are guaranteed under international law and stipulated in the Universal Declaration of Human Rights of 1948. The office was established by the United Nations General Assembly on 20 December 1993 in the wake of the 1993 World Conference on Human Rights.

The office is headed by the high commissioner for human rights, who co-ordinates human rights activities throughout the United Nations System and acts as the secretariat of the Human Rights Council in Geneva, Switzerland. The eighth and current high commissioner is Volker Türk of Austria, who succeeded Michelle Bachelet of Chile on 8 September 2022.

In 2018–2019, the department had a budget of US$201.6 million (3.7 per cent of the United Nations regular budget), and approximately 1,300 employees based in Geneva and New York City. It is an ex officio member of the Committee of the United Nations Development Group.

== Functions and organization ==
=== Mandate ===
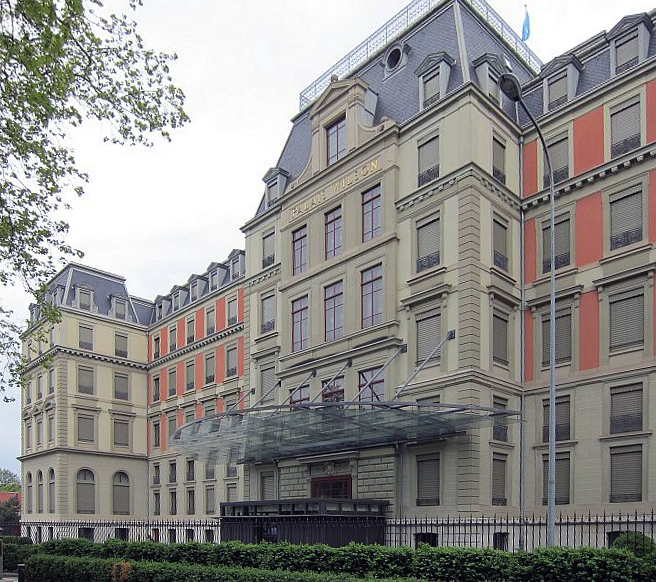
Office of the High Commissioner for Human Rights in Geneva

The mandate of OHCHR derives from Articles 1, 13 and 55 of the Charter of the United Nations, the Vienna Declaration and Programme of Action and General Assembly resolution 48/141 of 20 December 1993, by which the Assembly established the post of United Nations high commissioner for human rights. As part of a programme for United Nations reform (A/51/950, para. 79), the Centre for Human Rights was incorporated within the OHCHR on 15 September 1997.

In September 2026, the office added 61 companies to its database of businesses linked to illegal Israeli settlements in the occupied West Bank and occupied East Jerusalem, bringing the total to 214 companies across 11 countries. Inclusion in the database requires a company to be engaged in at least one of 10 prohibited activities, such as facilitating the construction and expansion of settlements, supplying surveillance and identification equipment, providing banking services, and delivering services and utilities. The applicable standard of proof is reasonable grounds to believe that a company is involved in at least one of these prohibited activities.

=== Purpose ===
The objectives of OHCHR are to:

1. Promote universal enjoyment of all human rights by giving practical effect to the will and resolve of the world community as expressed by the United Nations
2. Play the leading role on human rights issues and emphasize the importance of human rights at the international and national levels
3. Promote international cooperation for human rights
4. Stimulate and coordinate action for human rights throughout the United Nations system
5. Promote universal ratification and implementation of international standards
6. Assist in the development of new norms
7. Support human rights organs and treaty monitoring bodies
8. Respond to serious violations of human rights
9. Undertake preventive human rights action
10. Promote the establishment of national human rights infrastructures
11. Undertake human rights field activities and operations
12. Provide education, information advisory services and technical assistance in the field of human rights

=== Organization ===
The OHCHR is divided into organizational units, as described below. The OHCHR is headed by a High Commissioner with the rank of Under-Secretary-General.

==== High Commissioner for Human Rights (Under-Secretary-General) ====
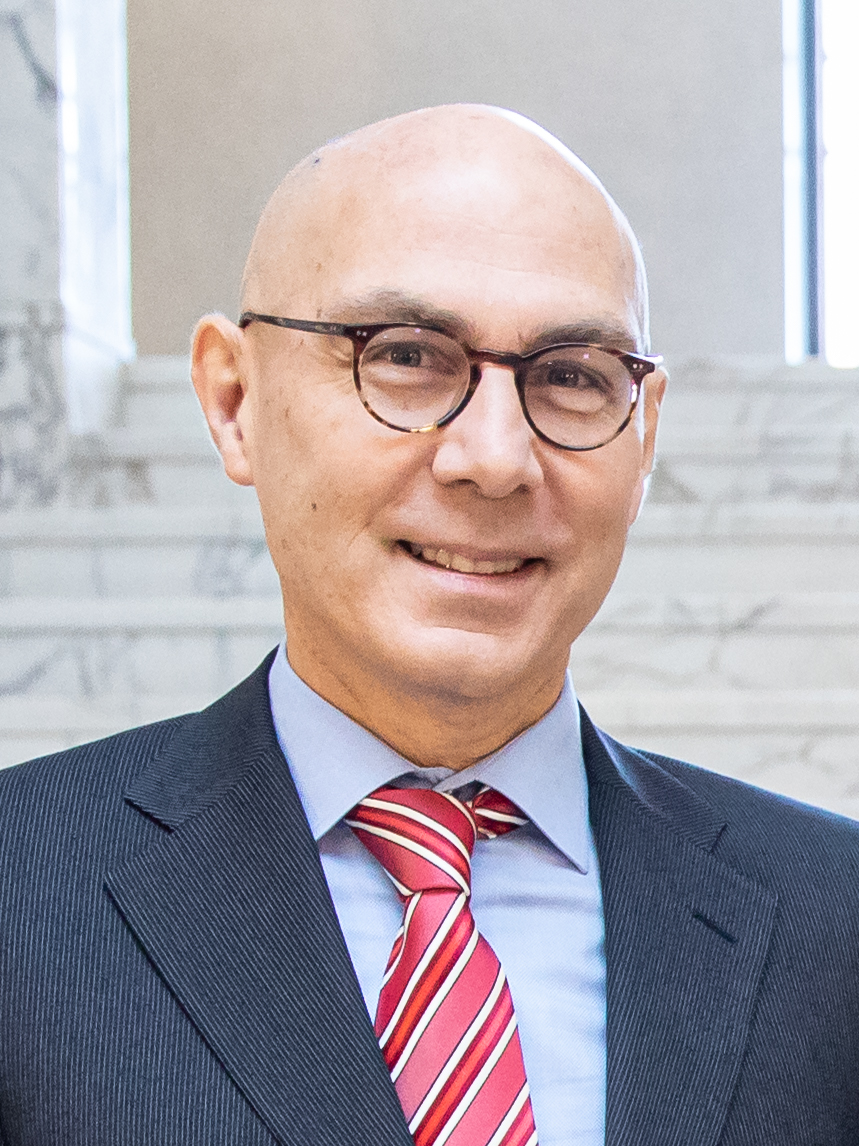
Volker Türk, the UN High Commissioner for Human Rights since October 2022

The United Nations high commissioner for human rights, accountable to the secretary-general, is responsible for all the activities of the OHCHR. He or she advises the Secretary-General on human rights issues, ensures that substantive and administrative support is given to the projects, activities, organs and bodies of the human rights programme, represents the secretary-general at meetings of human rights organs and at other human rights events, and carries out special assignments as decided by the secretary-general. In addition to human rights in legally binding treaties, the high commissioner also promotes human rights not yet recognized in international law, including economic, social and cultural rights.

==== Deputy High Commissioner for Human Rights (Assistant Secretary-General) ====
The deputy high commissioner lends specific substantive and administrative support to the high commissioner. The current deputy high commissioner is Kate Gilmore.

==== Assistant Secretary-General for Human Rights (UN Headquarters New York) ====
The assistant secretary-general for Human Rights heads the New York Office of the High Commissioner. The New York Office represents the high commissioner at United Nations Headquarters in New York and promotes the integration of human rights in policy processes and activities undertaken by UN inter-governmental and inter-agency bodies, including General Assembly and the Economic and Social Council. The post was created in 2010, when Ivan Šimonović was appointed to the position. From 2016 to 2019, the position was held by Andrew Gilmour. The current assistant secretary-general for human rights, since 2020, is Ilze Brands Kehris.

==== Thematic Engagement, Special Procedures and Right to Development Division ====
The Thematic Engagement, Special Procedures and Right to Development Division is headed by a director who is accountable to the high commissioner. The core functions of the division are to:

1. Promote and protect the right to development, in particular by:
  1. Supporting intergovernmental groups of experts on the preparation of the strategy for the right to development
  2. Assisting in the analysis of the voluntary reports by States to the High Commissioner on the progress and steps taken for the realization of the right to development and on obstacles encountered
  3. Carrying out research projects on the right to development and preparing substantive outputs for submission to the General Assembly, the Commission on Human Rights and treaty bodies
  4. Assisting in the substantive preparation of advisory service projects and educational material on the right to development
  5. Providing substantive analysis and support to the High Commissioner in his or her mandate to enhance system-wide support for the right to development
2. Carry out substantive research projects on the whole range of human rights issues of interest to United Nations human rights bodies in accordance with the priorities established by the Vienna Declaration and Programme of Action and resolutions of policy-making bodies
3. Support the work of the mandate-holders of the Special Procedures of the Human Rights Council
4. Provide substantive services to human rights organs engaged in standard-setting activities
5. Prepare documents, reports or draft reports, summaries and synthesis and position papers in response to particular requests, as well as substantive contributions to information materials and publications
6. Provide policy analysis, advice and guidance on substantive procedures
7. Manage the information services of the human rights programme, including the documentation centre and library, enquiry services and the human rights databases
8. Prepare studies on relevant articles of the Charter of the United Nations for the Repertory of Practice of United Nations Organs

==== Human Rights Council and Treaty Mechanisms Division ====
The Human Rights Council and Treaty Mechanisms Division is headed by a director who is accountable to the high commissioner. The core functions of the division are to:

1. Plan, prepare and service sessions/meetings of the Human Rights Council, the Advisory Committee and related working groups and of the committees established by human rights treaty bodies and their working groups
2. Ensure that substantive support is provided in a timely manner to the human rights treaty body concerned, drawing on the appropriate resources of the human rights programme
3. Prepare state party reports for review by the treaty body concerned and follow up on decisions and recommendations
4. Prepare or coordinate the preparation and submission of all substantive and other documents and the support from other management units to the activities of treaty bodies serviced, and following up on decisions taken at meetings of those bodies
5. Plan, prepare and service sessions of the board of trustees of the United Nations Voluntary Fund for Victims of Torture, and implement relevant decisions
6. Process communications submitted to treaty bodies under optional procedures and communications under the procedures established by the Economic and Social Council in its resolution 1503 (XLVIII) of 27 May 1970 and ensuring follow-up

==== Field Operations and Technical Cooperation Division ====
The Field Operations and Technical Cooperation Division is headed by a director who is accountable to the high commissioner. The core functions of the division are to:

1. Develop, implement, monitor and evaluate advisory services and technical assistance projects at the request of Governments
2. Manage the Voluntary Fund for Technical Cooperation in the Field of Human Rights
3. Implement the Plan of Action of the United Nations Decade for Human Rights Education, including the development of information and educational materials;
4. Provide substantive and administrative support to human rights fact-finding and investigatory mechanisms, such as special rapporteurs, representatives and experts and working groups mandated by the Commission on Human Rights and/or the Economic and Social Council to deal with specific country situations or phenomena of human rights violations worldwide, as well as the General Assembly's Special Committee to Investigate Israeli Practices Affecting the Human Rights of the Palestinian People and Other Arabs of the Occupied Territories
5. Plan, support and evaluate human rights field presences and missions, including the formulation and development of best practices, procedural methodologies and models for all human rights activities in the field
6. Manage voluntary funds for human rights field presences
7. Manage the United Nations Voluntary Fund on Contemporary Forms of Slavery, United Nations Voluntary Fund for Indigenous Populations and United Nations Voluntary Fund for the International Decade of the World's Indigenous People

_{(Source: OHCHR Website)}

== High commissioners for human rights ==
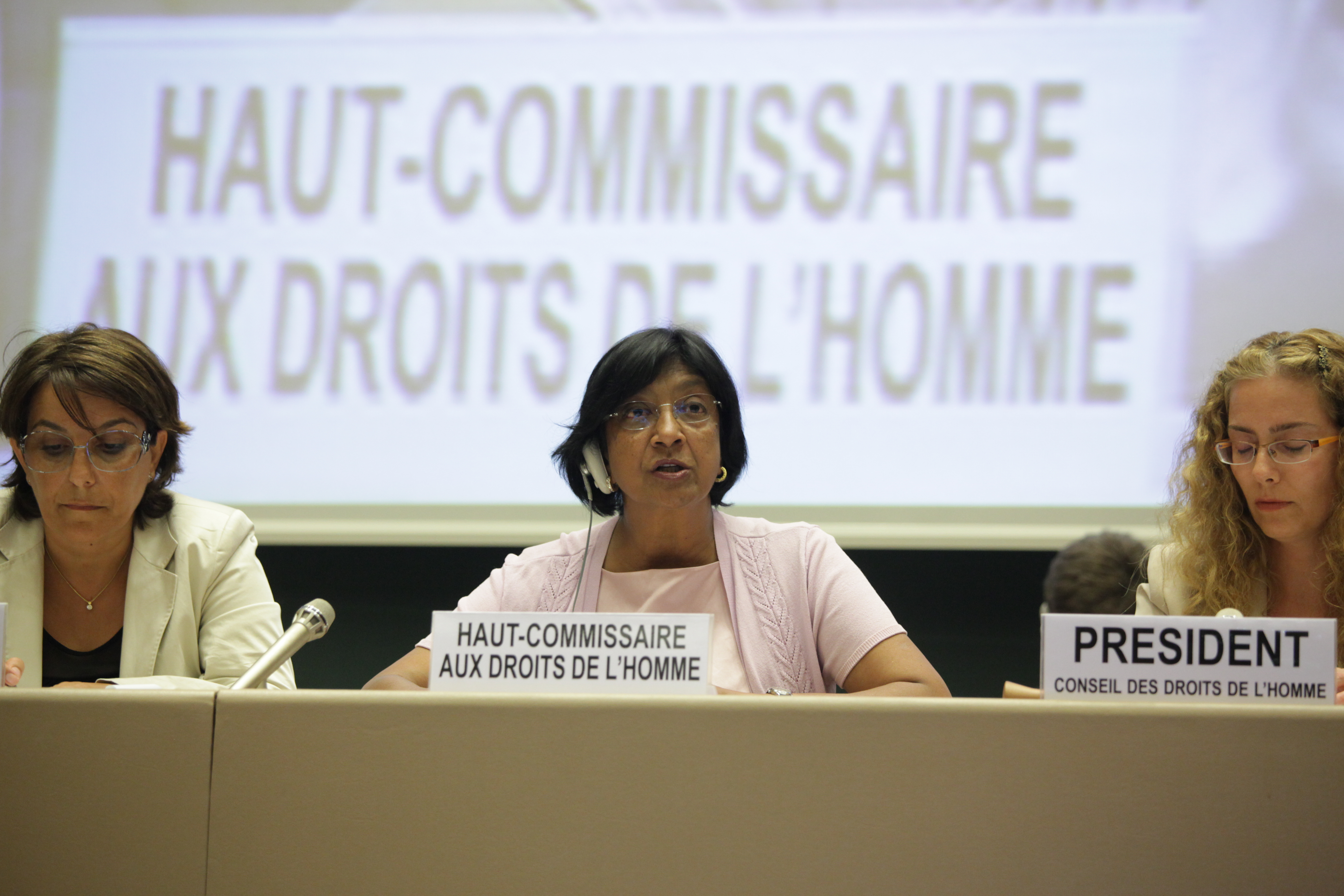
Navi Pillay (centre), High Commissioner for Human Rights from 2008 to 2014

United Nations High Commissioner for Human Rights
Image	Name	Country	Term	Notes
	José Ayala Lasso	Ecuador	1994–1997	
	Mary Robinson	(Republic of Ireland) Ireland	1997–2002	Term was not renewed by Secretary-General Kofi Annan
	Sérgio Vieira de Mello	Brazil	2002–2003	Killed in the Canal Hotel bombing in Baghdad on 19 August 2003
	Bertrand Ramcharan	Guyana	2003–2004	Acting High Commissioner
	Louise Arbour	Canada	2004–2008	Did not seek a second term
	Navi Pillay	South Africa	1 September 2008 – 31 August 2014	Her mandate was extended for an additional half term (two years) by the General Assembly on 1 September 2012
	Prince Zeid bin Ra'ad bin Zeid al-Hussein	Jordan	1 September 2014 – 31 August 2018	
	Michelle Bachelet	Chile	1 September 2018 – 31 August 2022	Elected by the General Assembly on 10 August 2018
	Volker Türk	Austria	8 September 2022 –present	Appointed by Secretary-General António Guterres on September 8, 2022, following approval by UN General Assembly. Term renewed by the UNGA on 24 July 2026

== Controversy ==
Journalist Emma Reilly alleged in 2021 that the OHCHR provided names of Chinese participants in UN human rights activities to China on request. This is supposed to have occurred on multiple occasions from before 2012 to at least 2019, despite an explicit ban against this sort of activity according to Reilly who says she found this in email correspondence. The OHCHR has rejected the claims, stating that the once standard practice of corresponding that way with national governments has not occurred since 2015.

== See also ==
- United Nations Commission on Human Rights (replaced by Human Rights Council in 2006)
- United Nations Human Rights Council
- United Nations Guiding Principles on Business and Human Rights
