= Kate Gilmore (UN official) =

U.N. official

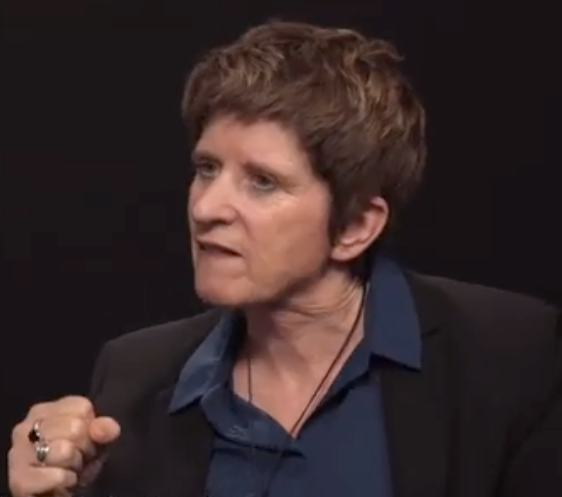
- In a UNOHCHR video in 2019

United Nations Deputy High Commissioner for Human Rights
- Incumbent
- Assumed office 2015

Personal details
- Education: University of New England; University of Melbourne
- Occupation: Activist, public servant

Kate Gilmore is an Australian human rights activist and Deputy High Commissioner for Human Rights of the United Nations.

== Education ==
Gilmore earned a Bachelor of Arts degree from the University of New England as well as a Bachelor's in Social Work from the University of Melbourne. She also did some postgraduate study in social work and community development in Australia.

== Career ==
Gilmore worked in a range of public sector and NGO positions. These include CEO of Broadmeadows Community Health Service (1992–1993) and manager of community care in the Royal Women's Hospital in Melbourne (1993–1996), where she established Australia's first Centre Against Sexual Assault and helped establish the Victorian Foundation for Survivors of Torture (Foundation House). For Amnesty she was national director of Amnesty International Australia (1996–2000) and executive deputy secretary general of Amnesty International (2000–2010).

At the United Nations, Gilmore became assistant secretary-general and deputy executive director (programme) of the United Nations Population Fund in 2012 and in 2015 deputy high commissioner for human rights. In this role she is accountable to the high commissioner, currently Volker Türk. Gilmore has been engaged in issues in Iraq on human rights violations and assisting the Iraq government.

== Other roles ==
As of 2019, Gilmore serves as a co-chair, along with Princess Sarah Zeid of Jordan, of Every Woman Every Child EveryWhere.
