= Mahama =

Mahama is an African given name and surname. People with this name include:

== Given name ==
- Mahama Awal, Cameroonian footballer
- Mahama Ayariga, Ghanaian politician
- Mahama Sawadogo, Burkinabé politician
- Mahama Johnson Traoré, Senegalese film director and producer

== Surname ==
- Aliu Mahama, Ghanaian engineer and politician
- Edward Mahama, Ghanaian physician and politician
- Emmanuel Adama Mahama, Ghanaian politician and father of John
- Ibrahim Mahama (disambiguation), several people
- John Mahama (born 1958), Ghanaian politician, president of Ghana
- Naser Toure Mahama (1965–2026), Ghanaian politician
