= Zeid bin Hussein =

Iraqi Hashemite prince then pretender (1898–1970)

Zaid bin Hussein GCVO GBE
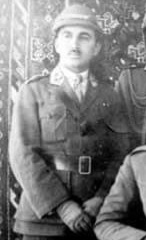

Head of the royal houses of Iraq and Syria
- Tenure: 14 July 1958 – 18 October 1970
- Predecessor: Faisal II
- Successor: Ra'ad bin Zeid
- Born: 28 February 1898; Ottoman Empire
- Died: 18 October 1970 (aged 72); Paris, France
- Spouse: Fahrelnissa Zeid (m. 1934)
- Issue: Prince Ra'ad bin Zeid
- House: Hashemite
- Father: Hussein bin Ali
- Mother: Adila Khanum

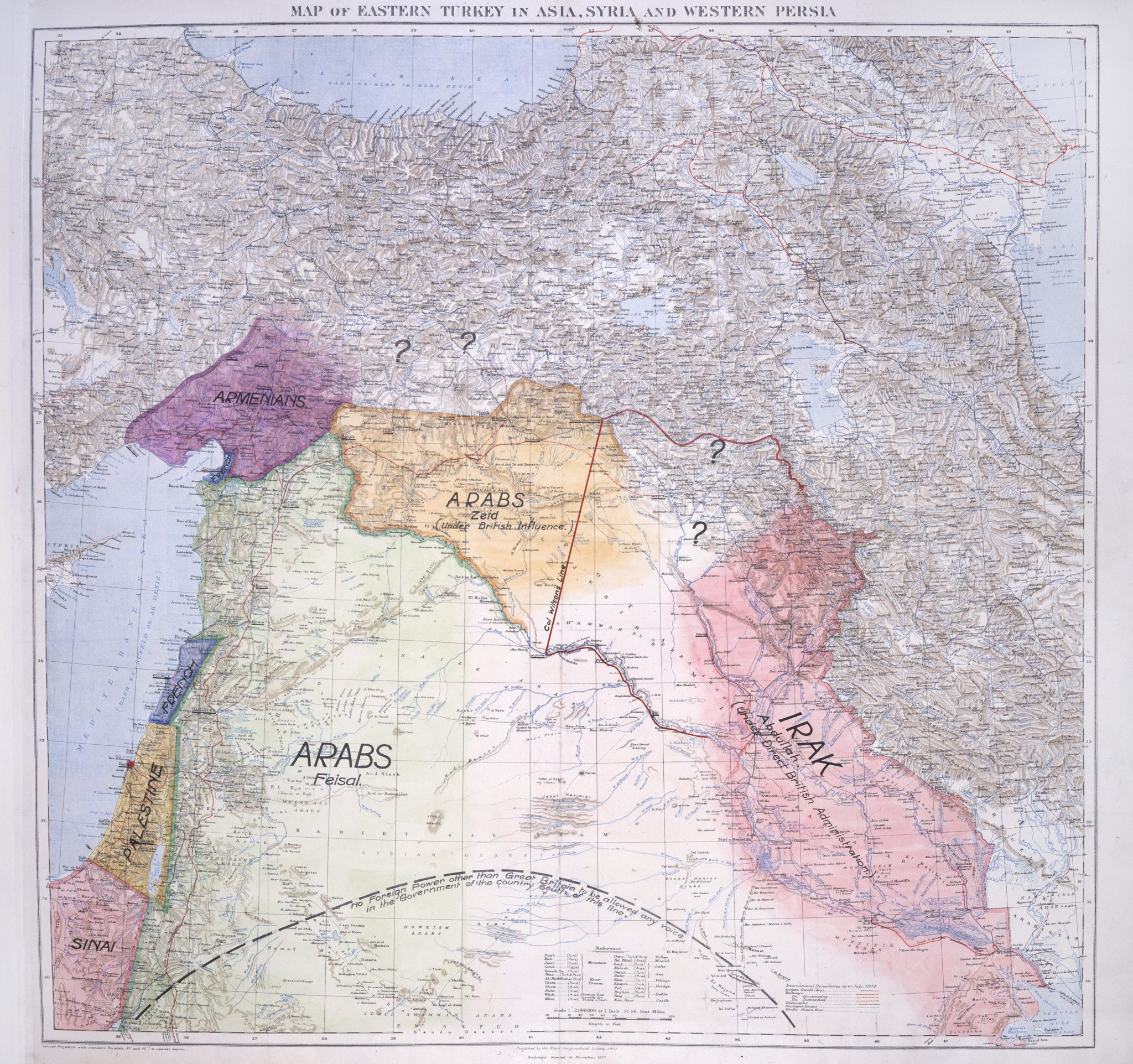
Map presented by TE Lawrence to the Eastern Committee of the War Cabinet in November 1918

Zaid bin Hussein (Arabic: زيد بن الحسين; (28 February 1898 – 18 October 1970) was an Iraqi prince who was a member of the Hashemite dynasty and the head of the Royal House of Iraq from 1958 until his death, after the royal line founded by his brother Faisal I of Iraq was killed.

== Biography ==
Prince Zaid was the fourth son of Hussein bin Ali, who was the Sharif and Emir of Mecca, and only son of Hussein and his Ottoman-Turkish third wife, Adila Khanum. He was educated at Galatasaray High School in Stamboul (Istanbul), Constantinople College and Balliol College, Oxford.

From 1916 to 1919, Prince Zeid was the Commander of the Arab Northern Army. In 1918, T. E. Lawrence suggested that he be made king of a truncated north-western Syria. The advent of French rule resulted in his assignment in 1923 to the Iraqi Cavalry and he was promoted to Colonel.

Zeid was also Iraqi ambassador in Berlin and in Ankara in the 1930s and in London in the 1950s.

On 14 July 1958 Prince Zeid became Head of the Royal House of Iraq, following the assassination of his grand-nephew King Faisal II by General Muhammad Najib ar-Ruba'i, who proclaimed Iraq to be a republic. Zeid and his family continued to live in London, where the family resided during the coup, as Zeid was the Iraqi ambassador there.

Prince Zeid died in Paris on 18 October 1970, and was buried in the Royal Mausoleum at Raghdan Palace, Amman, Jordan. His son prince Ra'ad bin Zeid succeeded him as head of the Royal House of Iraq.

== Marriage and children ==
In November 1933, Zeid married Fahrünissa Şakir (later known as Princess Fahrelnissa Zeid) in Athens, Greece. Together they had one son:

- Prince Ra'ad bin Zeid - born 18 February 1936, married to Margaretha Inga Elisabeth Lind (1942-2025).

== Ancestry ==
Hashemites

Hashim (eponymous ancestor)
Abd al-Muttalib
Abu Talib	Abdallah
Muhammad (Islamic prophet)
Ali (fourth caliph)	Fatimah
Hasan (fifth caliph)
Hasan Al-Mu'thanna
Abdullah
Musa Al-Djawn
Abdullah
Musa
Muhammad
Abdullah
Ali
Suleiman
Hussein
Issa
Abd Al-Karim
Muta'in
Idris
Qatada (Sharif of Mecca)
Ali
Hassan (Sharif of Mecca)
Abu Numayy I (Sharif of Mecca)
Rumaythah (Sharif of Mecca)
Ajlan (Sharif of Mecca)
Hassan (Sharif of Mecca)
Barakat I (Sharif of Mecca)
Muhammad (Sharif of Mecca)
Barakat II (Sharif of Mecca)
Abu Numayy II (Sharif of Mecca)
Hassan (Sharif of Mecca)
Abdullah (Sharif of Mecca)
Hussein
Abdullah
Muhsin
Auon, Ra'i Al-Hadala
Abdul Mu'een
Muhammad (Sharif of Mecca)
Ali
Hussein (Sharif of Mecca King of Hejaz)
Ali (King of Hejaz)	Abdullah I (King of Jordan)	Faisal I (King of Syria King of Iraq)	Zeid (pretender to Iraq)
'Abd Al-Ilah (Regent of Iraq)	Talal (King of Jordan)	Ghazi (King of Iraq)	Ra'ad (pretender to Iraq)
Hussein (King of Jordan)	Faisal II (King of Iraq)	Zeid
Abdullah II (King of Jordan)
Hussein (Crown Prince of Jordan)

Zeid bin Hussein House of Hāshim Born: 28 February 1898 Died: 18 October 1970
Titles in pretence
Preceded by None; King Faisal II killed during coup d'état	— TITULAR — King of Syria and Iraq; 14 July 1958 – 18 October 1970; Reason for succession failure: Kingdom abolished in 1920 & 1958	Succeeded by Prince Ra'ad bin Zeid
