= Mehmed Şakir Pasha =

Ottoman statesman (1855–1914)

Kabaağaçlızade Mehmed Şakir Pasha
- محمد شاكر پاشا
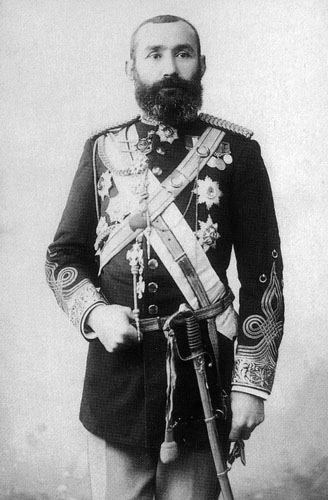

Ambassador of the Ottoman Empire to Athens
- In office 1893–1895
- Monarch: Abdul Hamid II
- Preceded by: Nikola Gobdan Efendi
- Succeeded by: Mehmed Asım Bey

Governor of Crete
- In office 1889–1890
- Monarch: Abdul Hamid II
- Preceded by: Hasan Rıza Pasha
- Succeeded by: Ahmed Cevad Pasha

Personal details
- Born: 1855 Bursa, Hüdavendigâr Eyalet, Ottoman Empire
- Died: July 28, 1914 (aged 58–59) Afyonkarahisar, Hüdavendigâr Eyalet, Ottoman Empire
- Cause of death: Assassination
- Resting place: Büyükada Cemetery, Istanbul
- Spouse: Sare İsmet Hanım
- Children: Asım Kabaağaçlı; Cevat Şakir Kabaağaçlı; Hakkiye Koral; Ayşe Erner; Suat Şakir Kabaağaçlı; Fahrünnisa Zeid; Aliye Berger
- Relatives: Notable relatives: Ahmed Cevad Pasha (brother) Füreya Koral (granddaughter) Erdem Erner (grandson) Nejad Melih Devrim (grandson) Şirin Devrim (granddaughter) Mehmet Emin Koral (son-in-law) İzzet Melih Devrim (son-in-law) Zayd bin Hussein (son-in-law)
- Education: Ottoman Military College
- Profession: Soldier, historian, diplomat, educator
- Awards: Order of Osmanieh (second and third class)

Military service
- Branch/service: Ottoman Empire Ottoman Army
- Years of service: 1878–1910
- Rank: Ferik (Lieutenant General)

Kabaağaçlızade Mehmed Şakir Pasha (Ottoman Turkish: محمد شاكر پاشا; 1855 – July 28, 1914) was an Ottoman Turk soldier, historian, diplomat, and educator. He served as the Ottoman Empire's Ambassador to Athens from 1893 to 1895, and briefly as the Governor of Crete from 1889 to 1890. He was the brother of Grand Vizier Ahmed Cevad Pasha and the father of the prominent writer Cevat Şakir Kabaağaçlı.

== Early life and education ==
His mother, Zehra Hanım, was the daughter of Hüseyin Bey from the notable Hattatzâde family of Syria. His father was Kabaağaçlızâde Miralay Mustafa Asım Bey, a member of a Turkmen tribe from Elmalı, Antalya. The family took the surname "Kabaağaçlı" from the Kabaağaç region in Afyonkarahisar where they had settled. His father married Zehra Hanım in Damascus where he had been stationed. Şakir Pasha's elder siblings Sare and Ahmed Cevad were born in Damascus. When Asım Bey became ill in 1853, he moved to Afyon for the climate, recovered, and was appointed principal of a newly opened secondary school in Bursa, where Mehmed Şakir was born in 1855.

The family moved to Istanbul in 1861 when Asım Bey was appointed to the Council of State's military branch. Both parents died in 1862, leaving the children orphaned: Sare was 13, Ahmed Cevad 12, and Mehmed Şakir just 7. They were taken in by Atıfzade Hüsameddin Efendi, then the Rumelian Kazasker and later Şeyhülislam.

Following his father and brother, Şakir Pasha pursued a military career. After completing secondary education, he attended military high school, then Ottoman Military Academy and Ottoman Military College, graduating as a staff captain in 1878.

== Career ==
Şakir Pasha entered military service in 1880 as a staff captain. In 1889, he served briefly as aide-de-camp to his brother Ahmed Cevad Pasha, then governor of Crete. He was later assigned as military attaché to Cetinje and Rome, and served as commander in Resmo, Crete. In 1890, he was appointed governor of Crete, and between 1893 and 1895 he served as Ottoman ambassador to Greece, holding private meetings with King George I of Greece and other senior officials. He was awarded a state medal by the king.

In 1895, after his brother was dismissed from the grand vizierate, Şakir Pasha resigned from his post in protest. He later served on the Military Inspection Commission and voluntarily taught history at Galatasaray High School. After his brother's death, he settled in Büyükada. Following the proclamation of the Second Constitutional Era, he retired from public service, citing government pressure and rejected proposals in a letter he later wrote.

== Personal life ==
Şakir Pasha was married twice. His first wife was of Hungarian descent and died young. Their son Asım also pursued a military career and served in the entourage of Prince Ahmed Nureddin. Şakir Pasha's granddaughter Nermidil Erner Binark claimed his first wife was the daughter of Grand Vizier Ömer Lütfi Pasha and that their marriage was arranged by Abdul Hamid II.

His second marriage was to Sare İsmet Hanım, daughter of a Cretan family he met while serving there. Together, they had six children: Cevat Şakir Kabaağaçlı (b. 1890), Hakkiye Koral (b. 1893), Ayşe Erner (b. 1895), Suat Şakir Kabaağaçlı (b. 1899), Fahrünnisa Zeid (b. 1901), and Aliye Berger (b. 1903). He placed great importance on their education and ensured they received a modern, Western-style upbringing. His oldest daughter Hakkiye married to General Mehmet Emin Koral, and from this union, the ceramic artist Füreya Koral was born. His second daughter, Ayşe, married Ahmed Fâik Erner, Governor of Sivas, and from this marriage their grandson, the diplomat Erdem Erner, was born. His third daughter, Fahrünnisa Zeid, first married Turkish poet İzzet Melih Devrim and later divorced. From this marriage, Nejad Melih Devrim and Şirin Devrim were born. She later married Zeid bin Hussein, the brother of King Faisal I of Iraq.

== Final years and death ==
The Şakir Pasha family was the first Turkish family to settle on Büyükada (Prinkipo). Even though he built his house in an area lacking water and electricity infrastructure, he managed to provide these utilities himself. Mehmed Şakir Pasha was known for his interest in science, culture, and painting, and he sought to improve himself in various artistic fields.

Before the Balkan Wars (1912–13), he sold all real estate inherited from Ahmed Cevad Pasha and invested the money in the construction of a hotel in Thessaloniki, following the suggestion of his wife İsmet Hanım's brother, Midhat Bey. When the hotel was burned down during the war, he faced financial difficulties. These hardships further deepened the existing tensions with his eldest son, Cevat Şakir. In 1914, he went to Afyon with his sons Suat and Cevat Şakir to inspect his farm and collect its income. On 28 July 1914, he was shot and killed on the farm by his son Cevat Şakir under circumstances that remain unclear. After his body was brought to Istanbul, he was buried in the Muslim Cemetery on Büyükada.

Cevat Şakir was sentenced to 14 years in prison for patricide. Following the loss of power by the Committee of Union and Progress, the government led by Damat Ferid Pasha declared a general amnesty; however, since his sentence had not yet been finalized, Cevat Şakir could not be released. While suffering from health problems in prison, Cevat Şakir wrote a petition to Ferid Pasha asking for his own pardon. After a lengthy bureaucratic process, Sultan Vahdettin ordered his release. He was released after serving seven years.

== Works ==
Bursalı Mehmed Tâhir gave the following information about Şakir Pasha’s works in his book Ottoman Authors:

Yeni Osmanlı Târihi (New Ottoman History): A five-volume work; only the first two volumes were published.

Selâhaddîn-i Eyyûbî (Saladin): A two-volume historical play; unpublished.

Mısır Târihi (History of Egypt): Unpublished.

Muhtelif Târîh-i İslâm ve Osmânî (Various Islamic and Ottoman Histories): Written for teaching at Galatasaray High School; unpublished.

İnekçilik ve Sütçülük (Dairy Farming and Milk Production): A detailed scientific work.

Arıcılık (Beekeeping): Unfinished.

== In popular culture ==
The life of Mehmed Şakir Pasha and his family was the subject of the 2024 TV series Şakir Paşa Ailesi: Mucizeler ve Skandallar, which aired on NOW. He was portrayed by actor Fırat Tanış.
