= Füreya Koral =

Turkish artist (1910–1997)

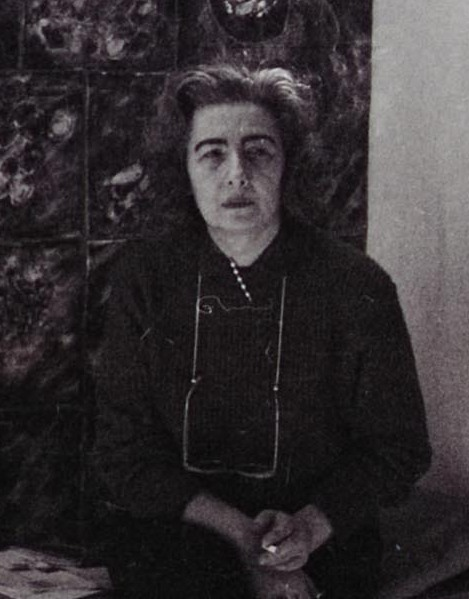
- Born: June 2, 1910; Büyükada, Istanbul, Ottoman Empire
- Died: August 25, 1997 (aged 87); Istanbul, Turkey
- Resting place: Büyükada Cemetery, Istanbul
- Parent(s): Mehmet Emin Koral; Hakkiye Hanım

Füreya Koral (June 2, 1910 – 25 August 1997) was a pioneering ceramics artist born into a prominent artistic family in Turkey.

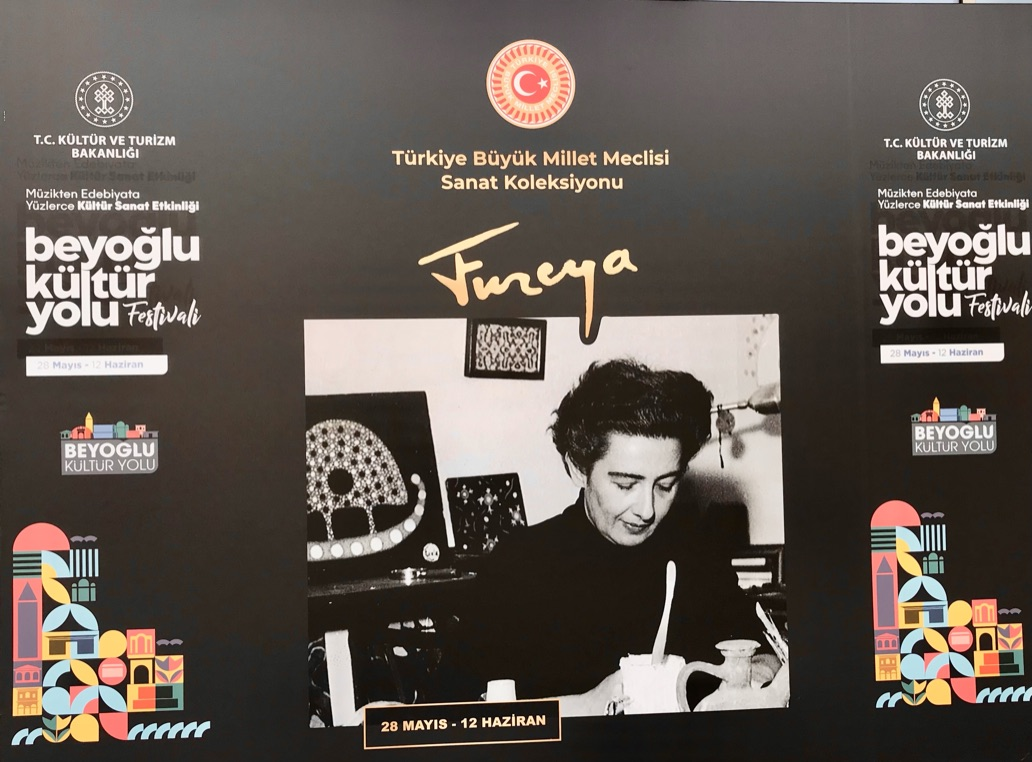
Exhibition of Füreya Koral's work at the Galataport in Istanbul in 2022

Known for her wall panels, Koral worked in a variety of media such as tiles and statuettes, and also created ceramic-inlaid tables and stools. She started working on ceramics after she was diagnosed with tuberculosis while receiving treatment at a sanatorium in Switzerland. A self-taught artist, her works were mostly ignored during her lifetime although she did create wood-and-ceramic furnishings for the new National Assembly Building in Ankara. Seeking to push the limits of ceramics beyond its function, she was inspired by the art of the ancient civilisations of Turkey, Mexico, and East Asia, especially Japan, and her work often combines elements taken from both Western and Eastern artistic traditions.

She signed her works with the anglicised version of her given name, Fureya.

== Early life ==
Füreya Koral was born in Büyükada, Istanbul. Her father was Mehmet Emin Paşa, a notable soldier and statesman in the Ottoman Empire and then a companion to Atatürk, her mother was Hakkiye Hanım, and her grandfather was Mehmed Şakır Paşa, an Ottoman statesman and historian. Like her aunts Fahrelnissa Zeid, Aliye Berger, and Ayşe Erdem, and her uncle Cevat Şakir Kabaağaçlı (the Fisherman of Halicarnassus), Koral was an enthusiast of music, painting, and literature.

She studied at the Lycée Notre Dame de Sion in Istanbul and graduated from a private Jewish High School in 1928. She then enrolled at the Department of Philosophy at the Istanbul University Faculty of Literature in 1929, but her father's illness and mandatory retirement forced her to quit university before graduating as the family's financial situation deteriorated.

In 1930, she moved to Bursa after marrying a farm owner named Selahattin Karacagil. The couple divorced in 1932, and in 1935 she remarried to Kılıç Ali, a close friend of Mustafa Kemal Atatürk. After Atatürk's death, the couple moved back to Istanbul.

Immediately after helping her aunt, artist Fahrelnissa Zeid, open her first solo exhibition in her home at the Ralli Apartment Block in 1945, Füreya was diagnosed with tuberculosis. She started treatment at a sanatorium in Switzerland, where she took painting lessons from a Polish artist.

== Artistic career ==
=== 1947–1954 ===
While in Switzerland Füreya began to experiment with ceramics using materials sent to her by her aunts Fahrelnissa Zeid and Aliye Berger. In 1949, she attended a ceramics workshop in Lausanne. In 1950, she moved to Paris to resume treatment for TB and there she crossed paths with the ceramics artist Georges Serré (1889–1956) and, on his advice, began working on firing techniques at a workshop outside Paris. She also met the art critics Jacques Lassaigne and Charles Estienne who advised her to stage an exhibition.

Her first solo exhibition opened at Galerie M.A.I. in Paris in 1951 and was followed by a solo exhibition in Turkey at the Maya Gallery founded by Adalet Cimcoz, one of the first private contemporary art galleries in the country. This exhibition featured wall ceramics inspired by the çini (tile) tradition and other works that treated folkloric themes.

She returned to Istanbul in 1953 and established one of the first private ceramic studios in Turkey at the El Irak apartment building on Cumhuriyet Caddesi in Harbiye where she lived with her husband.

=== 1954–1980 ===
After divorcing Kılıç Ali in 1954, Füreya moved her home and studio to the ground floor of the Şakir Pasha apartment building. In the 1950s this studio became a meeting place for young ceramic artists, including Ayda Arel, Alev Ebüzziya Siesbye and Leyla Sayar (Akkoyunlu), as well as Bingül Başarır, Candeğer Furtun, Binay Kaya, and Mehmet Tüzüm Kızılcan. It was also a gathering point for figures from the world of arts and culture of the period, including prominent writers such as Melih Cevdet Anday, Azra Erhat, Sabahattin Eyüboğlu, Vedat Günyol, Yaşar Kemal, Cevat Şakir Kabaağaçlı (her uncle) and Ahmet Hamdi Tanpınar.

In 1957, Füreya received a Rockefeller grant to study in the US, and then continued on to Mexico to carry out research on the Aztec and Mayan cultures. Encountering Mexico's widespread mural tradition reinforced her belief that art should not be trapped in museums and paved the way for the large panels she would go on to make for public spaces.

After returning to Istanbul in 1958, Füreya designed ceramic coffee cups for the Pavilion of Turkey at the Expo '58 Brussels World Fair. She also continued her collaborations with architects, ranging from Utarit Izgi to Haluk Baysal, Melih Birsel, Abdurrahman Hancı, and Selçuk Milâr. She created large-scale panels for the Marmara Hotel in the grounds of the Atatürk Forest Farm in Ankara in 1959; for the Hacettepe University Faculty of Medicine in 1965; for Ziraat Bank, Başak Insurance, and the Istanbul Textile Traders’ Market (Manifaturacılar Çarşısı) in 1966; for the Anafartalar Market in 1967; and for the Divan Hotel in 1968.

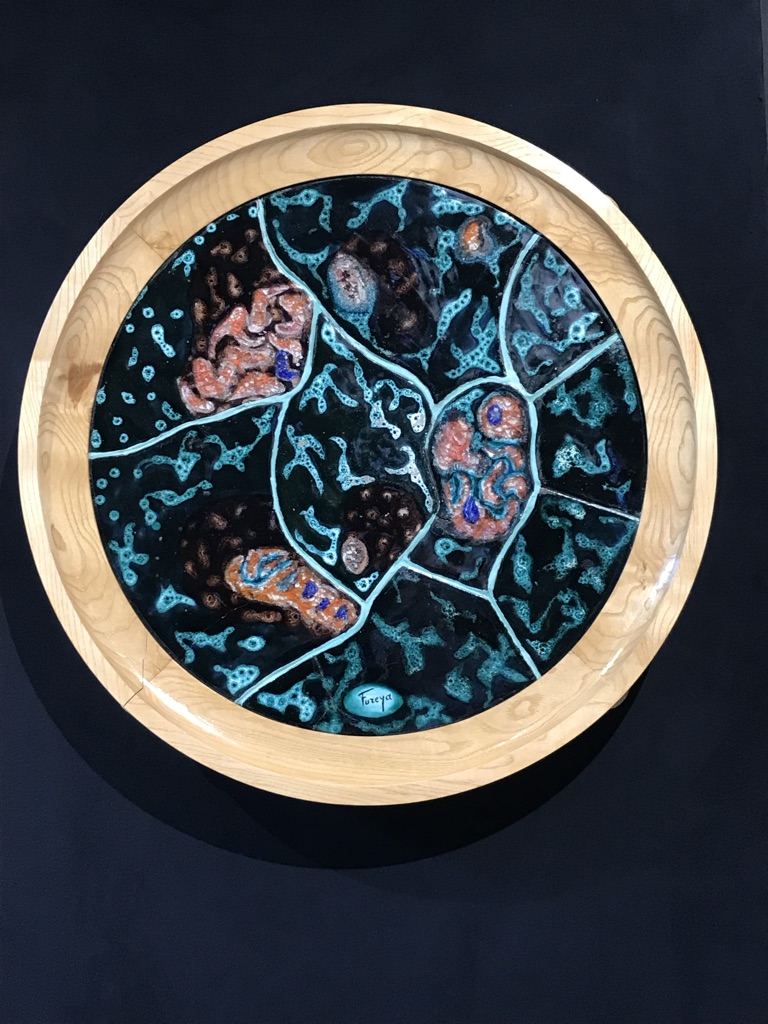
Ceramic inlaid coffee table, 1961

In 1960–61, Füreya was invited to provide a series of ceramic-inlaid coffee tables and stools to furnish the new National Assembly Building in Ankara.

In the 1970s, she focused on designing objects using the stoneware technique and created an exclusive series for the Istanbul Porcelain Factory in Tuzla in 1973. The same year, her works were exhibited at Yapı Endüstri Merkezi [Building Industry Centre].

=== 1980–1997 ===
Füreya became the chair of the Ceramicists Association founded in 1980. However it was shut down under martial law following the 1980 coup d'état. She produced a series called Houses—one of her best known works based on the row houses she could see from the Arif Paşa apartment building—between 1980 and 1985; exhibited at Maçka Art Gallery in Istanbul in 1985, these works were later awarded the Sedat Simavi Visual Arts Prize. In 1990, she exhibited terracotta figurines titled Walking People alongside works by forty artists who joined the exhibition With Respect to Fureya Koral on her 40th Year in Art, organised by Maçka Art Gallery.

Füreya Koral died on 25 August 1997.

== Exhibitions ==
"For me ceramic art, first of all is like a tool, or a book, or music. A tool to express the world, to make my own world come alive, a tool that makes living and sharing possible. I mean ceramics are not just decorative items or objects of consumption." (Füreya Koral, from her interview with Zeynep Oral, published in Milliyet Sanat on February 15, 1993)

Füreya participated in exhibitions at numerous galleries and institutions, including Salon d'Octobre, Paris; the Museum of Modern Art, Mexico City; Naprstkovo Museum, Prague; and the Smithsonian Institution in Washington, D.C.

Opened in the fall of 2017, a posthumous retrospective of her work at Akaretler Sıraevler, Istanbul included over 200 pieces, presented alongside archival materials such as letters and photographs. Organised by Károly Aliotti, Nilüfer Şaşmazer and Farah Aksoy, the exhibition aimed to present a comprehensive study of her work, which has, perhaps, been overshadowed by her gender and her family's important role in late Ottoman and early Turkish history.

In June 2022 some of Füreya's coffee tables and stools from Turkey's Grand National Assembly Art Collection (Türkiye Büyük Millet Meclisi Sanat Koleksiyonu) were shown in the new Galataport cruise terminal in Karaköy as part of the Beyoğlu Cultural Road festival alongside family photographs and memorabilia and copies of photographs of the artist taken by Ara Güler.

== Culture ==
Ayşe Kulin's novel Füreya, published in 2005, tells the ceramicist's story in fictional form.
