= İsmet İnönü House Museum =

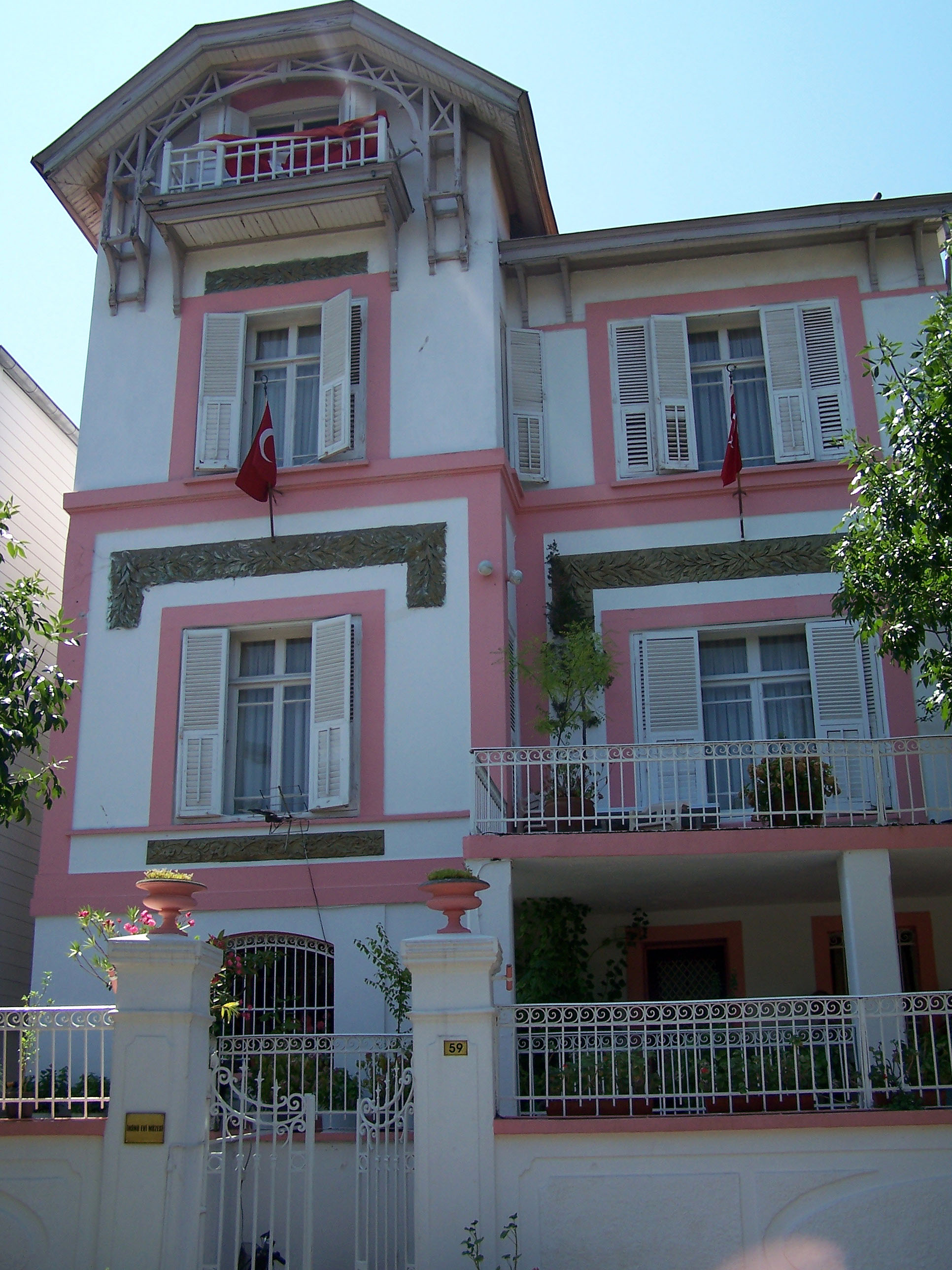

- Location of İsmet İnönü Museum in Istanbul
- Location: Refah Şehitler Cad 73, Heybeliada, Istanbul, Turkey
- Coordinates: 40°52′41″N 29°05′36″E
- Type: House museum
- Owner: Ministry of Culture and Tourism

İsmet İnönü House Museum is a house museum in Istanbul, Turkey.

The house is in Heybeliada, the second largest island of the Princes' Islands in Istanbul. The house, then known as Mavromatis Mansion (from the Greek family of Mavromàtis), was built in the 19th century.

In 1924, it was rented by the former prime minister İsmet Pasha, during the 3rd government of Turkey, in which he left his seat to Fethi Bey. However, in 1925, he returned to his former post. Beginning by 1925, the house was used by İsmet Pasha's family as a summer residence. In 1934, İsmet Pasha who has adopted the surname "İnönü" bought the house. The household furniture was donated by Atatürk, the president. In 1937, İsmet İnönü resigned from his post, and began living mostly in Heybeliada. The next year however, he was elected as the president, and began spending the vacations in other places, so the house lost its past liveliness. When ismet İnönü lost the 1950 general elections, the house once again returned to its former liveliness.

İsmet İnönü died on 25 December 1973. The family kept the house. Finally, it was decided to transform the house into a house museum, keeping the original furniture. The garden of the house is used by the Museum of the Princes' Islands.
