= Neveser Kökdeş =

Turkish composer

Neveser Kökdeş (1904–1962) was a female Turkish composer.

== Career ==
Kökdeş was born into a musical family in Üsküdar, Istanbul. Her father was a performer, and all of her brothers could play the piano. After primary school, Kökdeş went to the Lycée Notre Dame de Sion Istanbul and learnt to play the piano. Later, she worked in Turkish radio as a pianist. She expressed frustration about the conservatism of Istanbul composition with reference to the Turkish fes (men's cap like the North African Fez worn in Ottoman times) and complained that the secular Republic wasn't being integrated in new music. Her own compositions reveal her desire to be innovative: she composed varied song forms as well as tangos and waltzes, and she wrote her own lyrics as well. When her song “You are laughing, beautiful rose, laughing farewell” (Gülüyorsun güzelim gül, güle gülmek yaraşır) was first broadcast on the radio, she received many criticisms because of her unconventional composing style.

== Personal life ==
Kökdeş was pursued by an artillery officer called Mehnet Ali Bey when she was 16. They soon decided to get married, but her mother died during her wedding preparation. This was only the beginning of Kökdeş’s misfortune. Soon after her marriage, Mehnet Ali Bey entered the war of liberation and was killed when she was two months pregnant. Along with this hardship, Kökdeş realized that she was unable to use the right side of her face due to facial paralysis. She covered all the mirrors at home so as not to see her face in a mirror ever again. She indulged in the world of her imagination and created many new compositions. When her first song was published, the date coincided with the date of her brother’s funeral. Kökdeş was depressed because of the loss of her brother, her closest music supporter and helper. After her brother’s death, Kökdeş started to burn her compositions, and only about 100 out of approximately 500-1000 pieces can be found today.
