= Nazlı Ilıcak =

Turkish journalist and writer (born 1944)

- Born: Ayşe Nazlı Çavuşoğlu; 14 November 1944 (age 81); Ankara, Turkey
- Education: TED Ankara College, Lycée Notre Dame de Sion Istanbul, University of Lausanne
- Occupations: Journalist, writer
- Years active: 1972-2016
- Spouses: Kemal Ilıcak (m. 1969; died 1993) Emin Şirin (m. 1994; div. 2003)
- Children: 2

Nazlı Ilıcak (born Ayşe Nazlı Çavuşoğlu; 14 November 1944) is a prominent Turkish journalist and writer. She was a deputy of the Virtue Party, elected in the 1999 Turkish general election, losing her seat when the party was banned in 2001.

== Private life ==
Nazlı Ilıcak was born 1944 to Muammer Çavuşoğlu, a politician and former government minister, and his wife İhsan in Ankara, Turkey. Her brother is Ömer Çavuşoğlu.

She attended the TED Ankara College, completed her secondary education however at Lycée Notre Dame de Sion Istanbul. Ilıcak studied political science at the University of Lausanne.

In 1969, she married Kemal Ilıcak, publisher of the daily Tercüman. She became mother of two from this marriage. Her husband died in 1993 due to brain-bleeding. Ilıcak remarried one year later to Emin Şirin. Her second marriage ended in 2003 with divorce.

== Professional career ==
She entered journalism after her father's death in 1972. After working in various posts at Tercüman, she became publisher of the tabloid Bulvar. She later wrote for the newspapers Meydan, Hürriyet, Akşam, Yeni Şafak, Takvim, Sabah and Bugün.

Ilıcak and a dozen other prominent journalists lost their jobs in 2014 because they criticized the government.

== Political career ==
Ilıcak was a deputy of the Virtue Party, elected in the 1999 Turkish general election, losing her seat when the party was banned in 2001, and being banned from office for five years. She appealed to the European Court of Human Rights, Ilıcak v. Turkey (no. 15394/02), and it ruled this a violation of her human rights.

=== Prosecution ===
Ilicak continued writing anti-government articles defending Fethullah Gulen movement after the December 17/25 incidents in 2013. She was arrested in July 2016 as a part of ongoing purges after 2016 Turkish coup d'état attempt. On 16 February 2019 she received an aggravated life prison sentence. On 4 November 2019 the court of cassation lowered the sentence to 8 years, 9 months in prison, but released her on probation. She was released on 5 November 2019.

== Private life ==
She is the daughter of Muammer Çavuşoğlu, who served as a minister in the 21st and 22nd governments. She is the maternal uncle of Turhan Kapanlı, who served as a governor and as a minister in the 29th, 31st, 32nd, 39th and 41st governments. In 1969, she married her first husband, Kemal Ilıcak, the owner of Tercüman newspaper, and from this marriage she had two children, Mehmet Ali Ilıcak (b. 1970) and Aslı Ilıcak (b. 1972). Ilıcak, who lost Kemal Ilıcak on 7 April 1993, married businessman and politician Emin Şirin in 1994. After 9 years of marriage, the couple divorced in 2003.
