= Cevat Şakir Kabaağaçlı =

Cretan Turkish author, essayist, ethnographer, and travel writer (1890–1973)

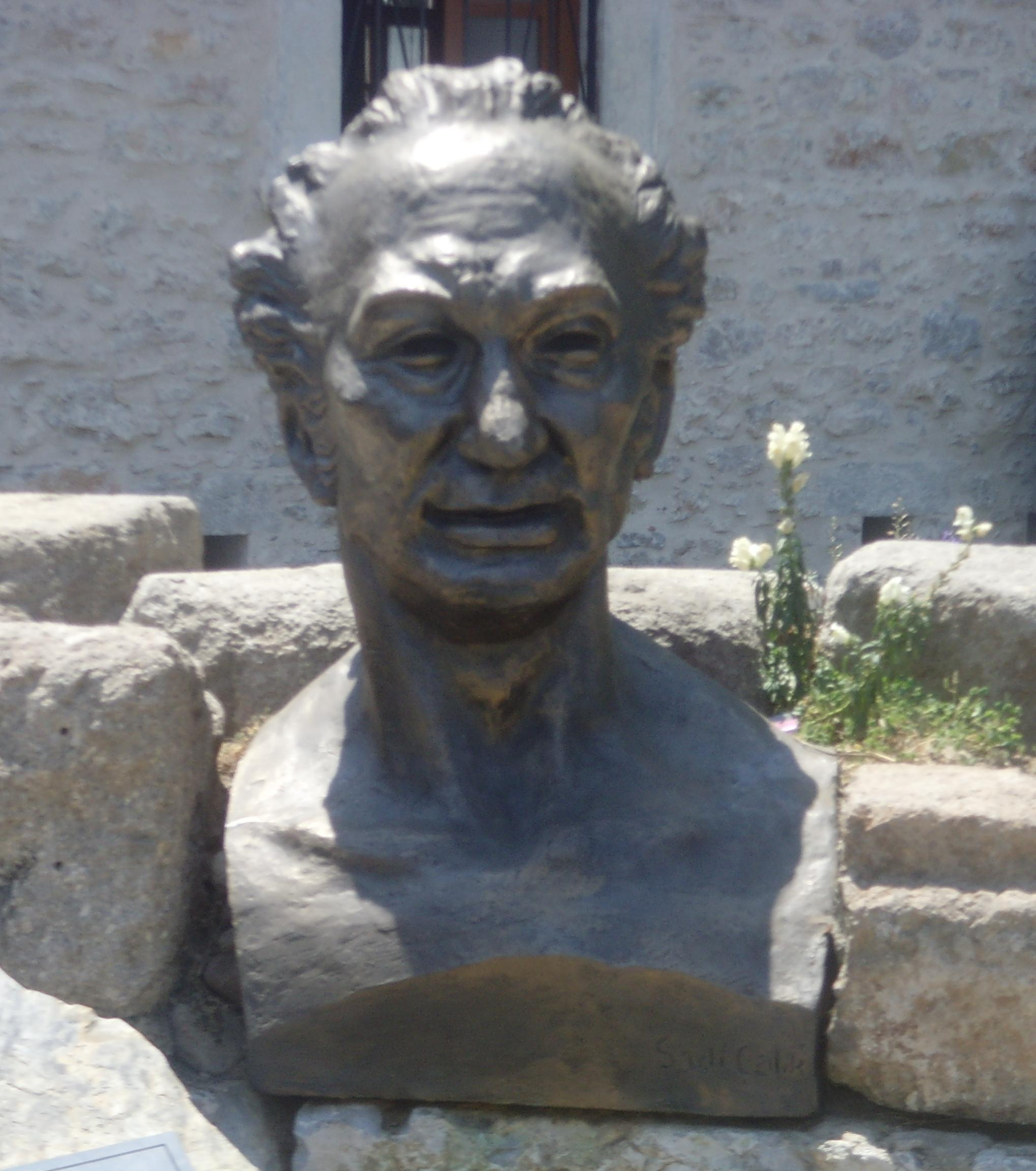
- Born: Musa Cevat Şakir; 17 April 1890; Crete, Ottoman Empire (present-day Crete, Greece)
- Died: 13 October 1973 (aged 83); İzmir, Turkey
- Other name: Fisherman of Halicarnassus
- Education: Robert College; University of Oxford
- Occupation: Writer
- Father: Mehmed Şakir Pasha
- Relatives: Fahrelnissa Zeid (sister); Aliye Berger (sister); Ahmed Cevad Pasha (uncle)

Cevat Şakir Kabaağaçlı (17 April 1890 – 13 October 1973; born Musa Cevat Şakir; pen-name "The Fisherman of Halicarnassus", Turkish: Halikarnas Balıkçısı) was a Cretan Turkish author, essayist, ethnographer, travel writer and tourist guide.

== Early life ==
On 17 April 1890, Cevat Şakir Kabaağaçlı was born in Crete, where his father was serving as a High Commissioner, to one of the Ottoman Empire's prominent families, the Şakir Paşa Family. His father, Mehmed Şakir Pasha, held positions as an ambassador and governor in Crete and Athens. His mother was Sare İsmet Hanım from Crete. His uncle was Ahmed Cevad Pasha, a Grand Vizier during the reign of Sultan Abdülhamid II, and his grandfather was Miralay Mustafa Asım Bey, the Chief of the Ottoman Military Judicial Council.

Cevat was born as the first child of Şakir Paşa. The night before his birth, his mother İsmet Hanım dreamed of the Prophet Moses, which inspired his first name, Musa. His full name, Musa Cevat Şakir, combines the names of his uncle Cevat and his father Şakir.

After completing his secondary education at Robert College in 1904, he initially wished to pursue maritime studies in England. However, at his family's insistence, he studied history at the University of Oxford. In 1908, he graduated from the Department of Modern History at the University of Oxford. In 1913, he married an Italian woman and settled in Italy, where he studied painting. He was the brother of artists Princess Fahrelnissa Zeid and Aliye Berger, and he grew up on Büyükada in Istanbul.

Upon returning to Istanbul, he began publishing articles in newspapers and magazines. In 1914, his family faced financial difficulties, prompting his father, Mehmed Şakir Paşa, to move to the Kabaağaçlı farm in Afyon. Tragically, during a dispute on the farm, his father was fatally shot by a bullet discharged from Cevat Şakir's gun. Cevat Şakir was subsequently tried for murder and sentenced to 15 years of hard labor. After serving seven years of his sentence, he was released due to tuberculosis.

Until 1925, Cevat Şakir made a living by publishing translations, articles in weekly magazines, creating paintings and new style illuminations, drawing caricatures, and designing colorful magazine covers. He contributed significantly to the development of cover design in the Turkish press.

Cevat Şakir, who later adopted the pseudonym Halikarnas Balıkçıs' (English: The Fisherman of Halicarnassus), was tried in the Istanbul Independence Tribunal for a story he wrote under the pseudonym Hüseyin Kenan. His story, dated April 13, 1925, titled "How Those Sentenced to Death in Prison Willingly Go to Their Execution," described the fate of four draft dodgers. He was found guilty of writing articles that incited military rebellion during a time of insurrection. Although the court, led by Ali Çetinkaya, initially wanted to sentence him to death, Kılıç Ali Bey's intervention resulted in his being exiled to Bodrum as a fortress prisoner.

He spent half of his three-year exile in Bodrum. After completing the remainder of his sentence in Istanbul, he returned to Bodrum, where he lived for about 25 years, drawn by his love for its people and natural beauty.

Adopting the ancient name of Bodrum, Halicarnassus, as his pen name, Cevat Şakir engaged in various occupations, including fishing, while in Bodrum. He wrote most of his literary works there. He was married three times; first to his cousin Hamdiye, then to Hatice Hanım, and had five children across these marriages. When his children reached secondary school age and no middle school was available in the town, he moved his family to İzmir.

Cevat Şakir died of bone cancer on October 13, 1973, in İzmir. Following his wishes, he was buried in Bodrum. His grave, chosen by his spiritual son Şadan Gökovalı, is located on Türbe Hill in Gümbet, Bodrum, next to a small museum dedicated to him, the Halikarnas Balıkçısı Museum.

== Career ==
After 1926, Cevat Şakir, known as Halikarnas Balıkçısı, gained renown for his sea stories. He drew inspiration from maritime events occurring along the coasts and in the open waters of the Aegean and Mediterranean regions. He vividly portrayed the free and rebellious sea he lived by, describing the lives of fishermen, divers, sponge hunters, and ships with a narrative enriched by a rich lexicon and mythology, conveying an endless admiration for the sea through a poetic, though occasionally uneven, but compelling storytelling style.

His writings and thoughts significantly influenced prominent intellectuals of his time, such as Azra Erhat, marking him as a key figure in the Turkish humanism movement, known as Mavi Anadoluculuk. His profound engagement with ancient cultures significantly promoted the appreciation of Latin and Greek history and language in Turkey. Cevat Şakir also translated around a hundred books from various languages and saw numerous reprints of his own works. In recognition of his cultural contributions, the Ministry of Culture awarded him the State Culture Award in 1971.

During his time in Bodrum, he and his friends pioneered the concept and practice of the Blue Cruise, an approach to sailing that emphasized simplicity and detachment from modern distractions. He is credited with bringing the fishing and sponge-diving town to the attention of the Turkish intelligentsia and business circles and then to the reading public, thereby starting its journey to become a major international tourist attraction. He is credited with inventing the Blue Cruise that has become a feature of Southern Aegean and Mediterranean tourism. Essential items for these voyages included cheese, water, İstanköy rusks, tobacco and rakı, eschewing newspapers and radios to escape from the world and find peace of mind. These voyages, starkly contrasting with the luxurious blue cruises of today, profoundly influenced his literary output. One of his poems about Bodrum, displayed on a sign in the city, captures the essence of its enchanting effect: "When you reach the hill, you will see Bodrum. Don't think you'll leave as you came. Others before you thought the same, as they departed they left their soul behind in Bodrum."

In 1950, he took a minor role in a film, adopting the screen name Cevat Şakir Kabaağaç. Known for his erudition and colorful personality, Şakir significantly influenced the development of intellectual ideas in Turkey throughout the 20th century. An early advocate for the environment, many of the trees he planted continue to thrive in Bodrum to this day.

A comprehensive bibliography of his works can be found in the October 1974 issue of Yeni Yayınlar magazine.

== Recognition ==
On 17 April 2015, Google celebrated his birthday with a Google Doodle.

The story of the Fisherman of Halicarnassus is featured in his niece Shirin Devrim's 1994 book, A Turkish Tapestry: The Shakirs of Istanbul.

== Works ==
=== Non-fiction ===
- The Sixth Continent (1991), written for the Turkish Ministry of Foreign Affairs; illustrated with photographs by Ara Güler

=== Short stories ===
- Ege Kıyılarından (1939)
- Merhaba Akdeniz (1947)
- Ege’nin Dibi (1952)
- Yaşasın Deniz (1954)
- Gülen Ada (1957)
- Ege’den (1972)
- Gençlik Denizlerinde (1973)
- Parmak Damgası (1986)
- Dalgıçlar (1991)
- Gündüzünü Kaybeden Kuş

=== Novels ===
- Aganta Burina Burinata (1945)
- Ötelerin Çocuğu (1956)
- Uluç Reis (1962)
- Turgut Reis (1966)
- Deniz Gurbetçileri (1969)

=== Essays ===
- Anadolu Efsaneleri (1954)
- Anadolu Tanrıları (1955)
- Mavi Sürgün (self-biography, 1961)
- Anadolu’nun Sesi (analysis, 1971)
- Hey Koca Yurt (1972)
- Merhaba Anadolu (1980)
- Düşün Yazıları (1981)
- Altıncı Kıta Akdeniz (1982)
- Sonsuzluk Sessiz Büyür (1983)
- Çiçeklerin Düğünü (1991)
- Arşipel (1993)

== See also ==
- Blue Cruise
- Azra Erhat
- Sabahattin Eyüboğlu
- Fahrelnissa Zeid
- Aliye Berger
- Füreya Koral
