= Lycée Notre Dame de Sion Istanbul =

- Notre Dame de Sion Özel Fransız Lisesi
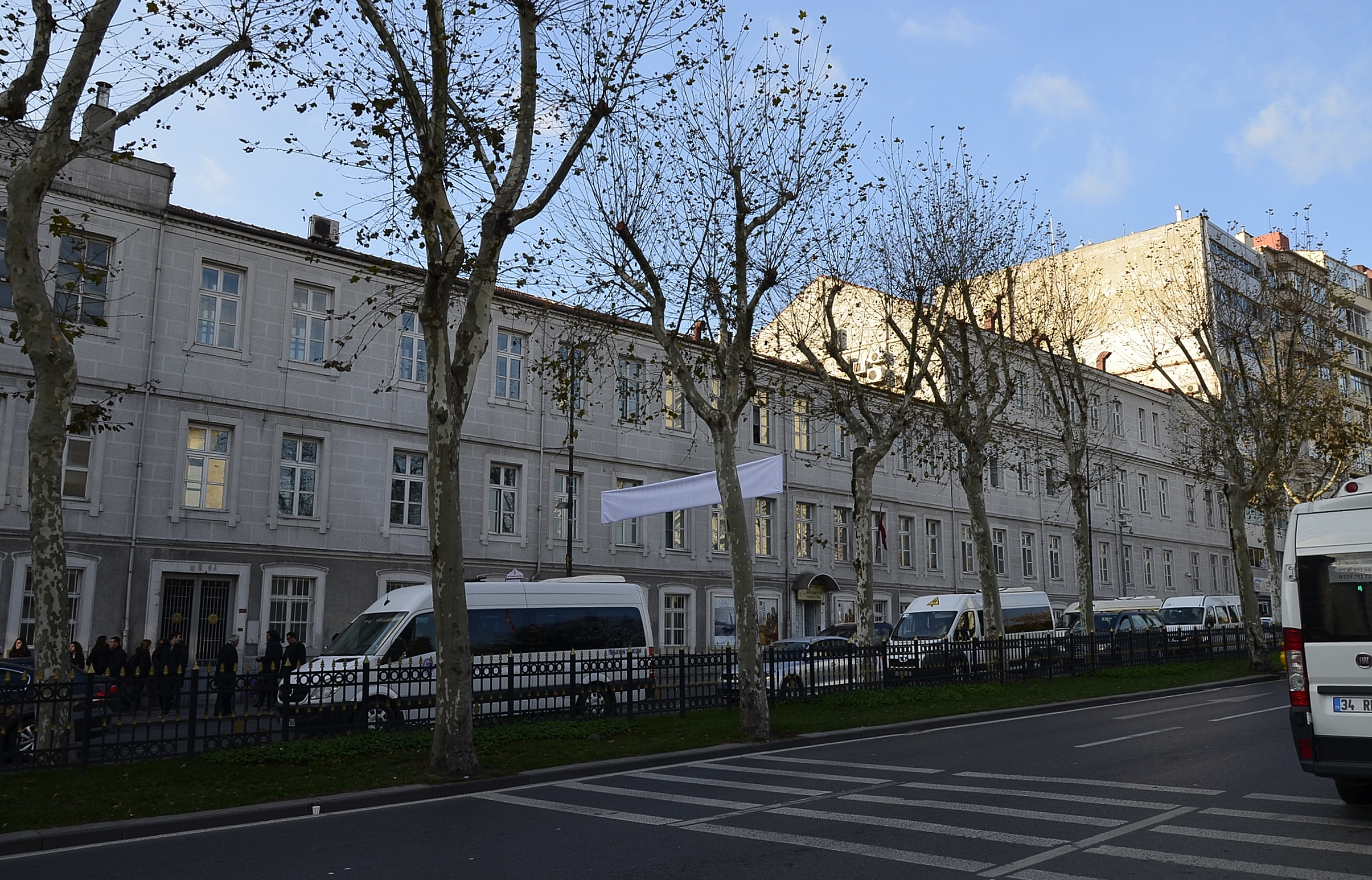
- High school building in Cumhuriyet Caddesi

Location
- Cumhuriyet Caddesi No: 127; Harbiye, Şişli, Istanbul; Turkey
- Coordinates: 41°02′41″N 28°59′09″E

Information
- Type: Private
- Religious affiliation: Roman Catholic
- Established: November 27, 1856; 169 years ago
- Grades: Preparatory class to 12
- Gender: Co-educational
- Website: nds.k12.tr

Lycée Notre Dame de Sion Istanbul (Turkish: Notre Dame de Sion Özel Fransız Lisesi) is a French private high school located in the Harbiye, Şişli neighbourhood of Istanbul, Turkey. It was founded in 1856.

The high school was established in the Ottoman Empire as a missionary school for girls only. It was later transformed into a co-educational status. The Medium of instruction from preparatory class through twelfth grade is in the French and Turkish language, and takes four years after a preparatory class of one school year.

NDS Schools (Turkish: Neslin Değişen Sesi Okulları or NDS Okulları), established in 2001 by the Notre Dame de Sion High School Education Foundation, offers French-language education for preschool, primary, and middle school levels in Istanbul suburb Bahçeşehir, Başakşehir.

== History ==
A group of eleven French nuns traveled to Istanbul arriving on October 7, 1856. They took over the administration of Maison du Saint-Esprit, a boarding school in the Pangaltı neighborhood, which was named after the 1846-built Cathedral of the Holy Spirit next to it, and was run by the Daughters of Charity of Saint Vincent de Paul (French: Filles de la Charité), a society of apostolic life for women within the Catholic Church. The official opening of the French boarding school under the name Lycée Notre Dame de Sion took place on November 27 of the same year. It became the first ever girls' school in Turkey. Initially a boarding school for Christian girls, it shortly after attracted Jewish pupils. From 1863 on, Muslim girls attended the school following the interest of the notable families in the Empire and the approval of the Ottoman Sultan.

The school closed down during World War I when the French nuns left the country as a result of their country being at war with Turkey.

In 1919, the school reopened. With the foundation of the Turkish Republic in 1923, the school was subordinated to the Ministry of National Education, and Turkish administrators and teachers joined the school staff. It began also to serve as a day school. The primary school section was closed in 1971, and the boarding school in 1972. From 1989 on, the head of the school administration was handed over to a secular rector while the nuns remained serving in the school as well. After a 140-year long tradition of girls only school, it went co-educational, accepting boys with the 1996–97 school year.

== Cultural projects ==
An international piano contest was organized by the school in 2013.

A chamber music concert was performed in the school in 2014 in commemoration of harpist Fatma Ceren Necipoğlu, who died at the Air France Flight 447 accident in 2009.

In 2015, the art gallery of the school hosted an exhibition titled "Osmanlı'dan Cumhuriyet'e Kadınlar" (English: Women from the Ottoman Empire to the Turkish Republic) showing Christian, Jewish and Muslim women mainly on postcards from 1880 to 1930.

== Notable alumni ==
- Mustafa Kemal Atatürk's adoptive children, including Afet İnan (1908–1985)
- Ayla Algan (born 1937), film and stage actress and singer
- Adile Ayda (1912–1992), diplomat
- Oya Baydar (born 1940), sociologist and writer
- Aliye Berger (1903–1974), artist, engraver and painter
- Selina Özuzun Doğan (born 1977), lawyer and politician
- Balçiçek İlter (born 1973), journalist and television presenter
- Güzin Sayar (1922-2006), journalist and agony aunt known as 'Güzin Abla'
- Nazlı Ilıcak (born 1944), journalist and writer
- Suzan Kahramaner (1913–2006), mathematician, one of the first Turkish female mathematicians with Ph.D.
- Füreya Koral (1910–1997), ceramist
- Matild Manukyan (c. 1916-17–2001), businesswoman
- Bedia Muvahhit (1897–1994), stage and movie actress
- Türkan Rado (1915–2007), first ever Turkish female professor of jurisprudence
- Pınar Selek (born 1971), sociologist, writer and feminist
- Princess Fahrelnissa Zeid (1901–1991), painter

=== Fictional Alumni ===
- Feride, the main character of Reşat Nuri Güntekin's novel Çalıkuşu, was educated at Notre Dame de Sion Istanbul.

== See also ==
- Education in the Ottoman Empire
