= Balçiçek İlter =

Turkish journalist, columnist and television presenter (born 1973)

- Born: June 16, 1973 (age 53); Istanbul, Turkey
- Education: Psychology
- Occupations: Journalist, columnist and TV presenter
- Years active: 2000–present
- Children: Two

Balçiçek İlter, formerly also known as Balçiçek Pamir (born June 16, 1973, İstanbul), is a Turkish journalist, columnist and television presenter.

== Early years ==
She studied psychology at the Middle East Technical University in Ankara after finishing the French Lycée Notre Dame de Sion Istanbul.

At the age of 17, Balçiçek İlter started to write at the Turkish edition of Cosmopolitan magazine promoted by Ercan Arıklı, a prominent journalist. Still in high school, she wrote for the political magazine Aktuel. During her university years, she continued to write at Aktuel's Ankara office. She gained wide experience in journalism during this time and after her transfer to the Ankara office of Sabah newspaper.

== Career ==
At the age of 29, she became Sabah's editor-in-chief, the first woman to hold this title so far at the newspaper. Balçiçek İlter left Sabah to join Habertürk, after her writings were heavily criticized. Additionally, she was tasked to present programmes at Habertürk TV, the sister media of newspaper Habertürk. Currently, she presents two programmes "Söz Sende" (It's your turn to talk) on weekdays and "Karşıt Görüş" (Opposite Opinion) at prime time on Wednesdays at Habertürk TV channel, hosting notable guests from various fields like politics, economics and arts.

== Manipulative news and incitement of popular hatred controversy ==
During the Gezi protests in Turkey, she wrote in her column an interview about a woman named Zehra Develioğlu, who falsely claimed that 70 up to 100 shirtless men in leather pants had beaten and afterwards urinated on her because she was wearing a scarf and showing that she was a Muslim. This news instantly sparked outrage in the country and a discredit campaign against the protesters was launched by mostly state-controlled media in Turkey. This and another fabricated news about "protesters drinking beer in a mosque" helped the Islamic government of Turkey to gain the support of the mostly uneducated Islamic masses in Turkey to stop the protests violently. In February 2014, released surveillance camera videos from the time and place where Develioğlu and Ilter claimed that the incident happened were released showing Develioğlu passing by a crowd of protesters without any physical contact. Since then Ilter had sent out Tweets to apologize and to throw Develioğlu under the bus.

During the discredit campaign it came out that Zehra Develioğlu was the daughter-in-law of the Bahçelievler district mayor from the ruling Justice and Development Party (AKP).

Ilter wrote in her column in the daily Türkiye on February 15, 2014, that she tried to get in contact with Develioğlu or her father-in-law with no success after she saw in the released footage that there was no physical attack on the headscarf-wearing woman. İlter admitted her mistake, and stated that she might have made many mistakes in her 23-year-long journalism career.

== Personal life ==
Balçiçek İlter was married in 2003 to Ali Pamir, a marketing and advertising specialist. She gave birth to twins, daughter Lal and son Kuzey, on May 17, 2007. The couple divorced in October 2010. She gave up her family name Pamir, since her husband did not allow that she bears his surname.
