= Ahmed Cevad Pasha =

Grand Vizier of the Ottoman Empire from 1891 to 1895

Kabaağaçlızade Ahmed Cevad Pasha
- احمد جواد پاشا
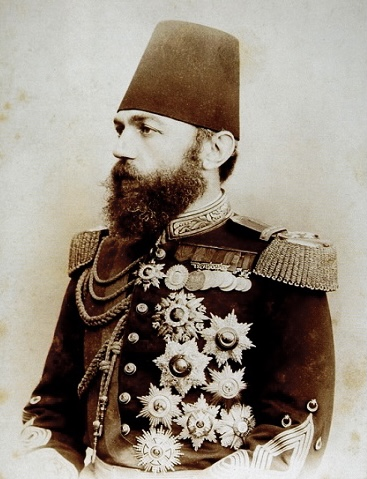
- Photograph, 1893

Military Governor of Crete
- In office 24 July 1897 – 10 October 1898

Grand Vizier of the Ottoman Empire
- In office 4 September 1891 – 8 June 1895
- Monarch: Abdülhamid II
- Preceded by: Mehmed Kamil Pasha
- Succeeded by: Mehmed Said Pasha

Ottoman Governor of Crete
- In office 1890–1891
- Preceded by: Shakir Pasha
- Succeeded by: Mahmud Celaleddin Pasha

Personal details
- Born: 1851 Istanbul, Ottoman Empire
- Died: 10 August 1900 (aged 48–49) Istanbul, Ottoman Empire
- Spouse: Nimet Hanım
- Relatives: Mehmed Şakir Pasha (brother); Cevat Şakir Kabaağaçlı (nephew); Fahrünnisa Zeid (niece); Aliye Berger (niece)
- Profession: Statesman

Ahmed Cevad Pasha (Ottoman Turkish: احمد جواد پاشا, Turkish: Kabaağaçlızade Ahmet Cevat Paşa; 1851 – 10 August 1900) was an Ottoman Turkish career officer and statesman. He served as Grand Vizier of the Ottoman Empire from September 4, 1891, to June 8, 1895. He was of Turk origin.

He was the uncle of Turkish writer Cevat Şakir Kabaağaçlı and the painters Aliye Berger and Fahrelnissa Zeid.
