= Princess Fahrelnissa Zeid =

Turkish artist (1901–1991)

- Born: Fahrünissa Şakir; 6 December 1901; Büyükada island, Istanbul, Ottoman Empire
- Died: 5 September 1991 (aged 90); Amman, Jordan
- Spouses: Izzet Melih Devrim (m. 1920; div. 1934) Prince Zeid bin Hussein (m. 1934; died 1970)
- Issue: Faruk Devrim; Nejad Devrim; Şirin Devrim; Prince Ra'ad bin Zeid
- Father: Şakir Pasha
- Mother: Sara İsmet Hanım
- Known for: Painting, collage, sculpture

Princess Fahrelnissa Zeid (Arabic: فخر النساء زيد, Fakhr un-nisa or Fahr-El-Nissa, born Fahrünissa Şakir (Kabaağaçlı); 6 December 1901 – 5 September 1991) was a Turkish artist best known for her large-scale abstract paintings with kaleidoscopic patterns as well as her drawings, lithographs, and sculptures. Zeid was one of the first women to go to art school in Istanbul.

She lived in different cities and became part of the avant-garde scenes in 1940s Istanbul, and post-war Paris, there becoming part of the new School of Paris. Her work has been exhibited at various institutions in Paris, New York, and London, including the Institute of Contemporary Art in 1954. In the 1970s, she moved to Amman, Jordan, where she established an art school. In 2017, Tate Modern in London organised a major retrospective and called her "one of the greatest female artists of the 20th century". Her largest work to be sold at auction, Towards a Sky (1953), went for just under one million pounds in 2017. Her record is the US$2,741,000 sale of her Break of the Atom and Vegetal Life (1962) in 2013 by Christie's.

In 1920, Şakir married Izzet Devrim, with whom she had three children: Faruk, Nejad, and Şirin. Şakir divorced Devrim in 1934. The same year, she married Prince Zeid bin Hussein, a member of the Hashemite royal family of Iraq. They were the parents of Prince Ra'ad bin Zeid.

== Biography ==
=== Early life ===
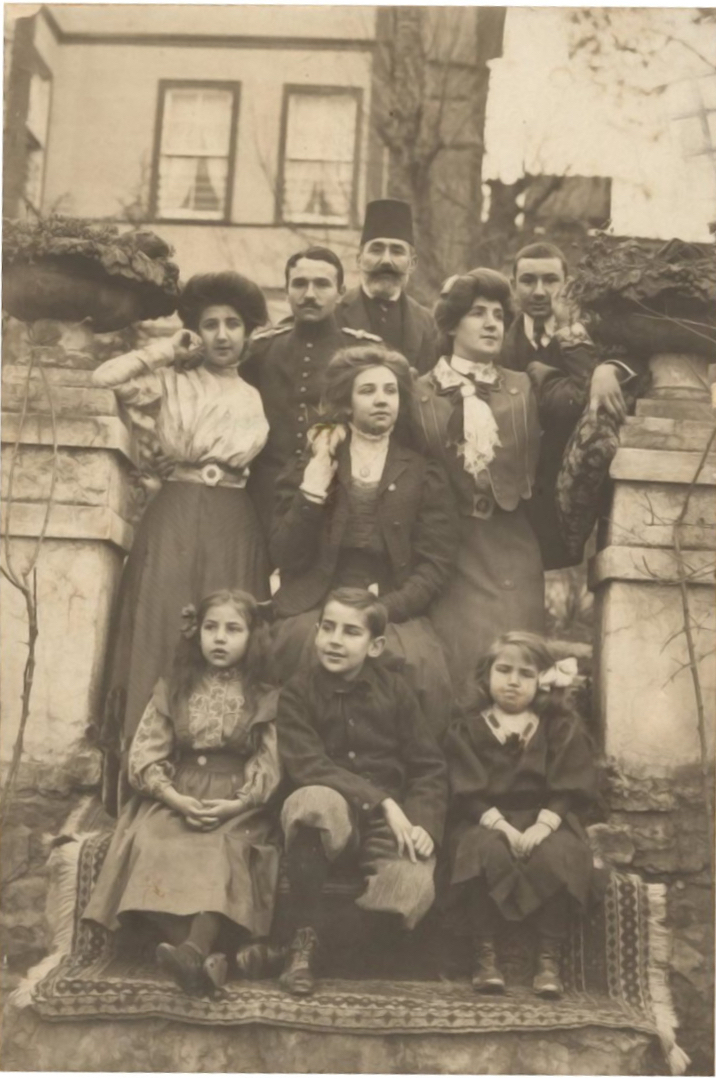
Fahrünissa Şakir (seated on the left) with her family, Büyükada (c. 1910)

Fahrünissa Şakir was born in 1901 into the Ottoman Şakir Pasha family on the island of Büyükada in Istanbul. Her uncle Ahmed Javad Pasha served as the Grand Vizier of the Ottoman Empire from 1891 to 1895 and another uncle, Cevat Çobanlı, was a World War I hero. Fahrünissa's father, Şakir Pasha, was appointed ambassador to Greece, where he met her mother, Sara İsmet Hanım. In 1913, her father was fatally shot and her brother, Cevat Şakir Kabaağaçlı, was tried and convicted of his murder.

Şakir began drawing and painting at a young age. Her earliest known surviving work is a portrait of her grandmother, painted when she was 14. In 1919, she enrolled at the Academy of Fine Arts for Women in Istanbul.

In 1920 at the age of nineteen, Şakir married the novelist İzzet Melih Devrim. For their honeymoon, Devrim took Şakir to Venice where she was exposed to European painting traditions for the first time. They had three children together. Her eldest son, Faruk (born 1921), died of scarlet fever in 1924. Her son Nejad Devrim (born 1923) went on to become a painter, and her daughter Şirin Devrim (born 1926) became an actress.

Şakir travelled to Paris in 1928 and enrolled at the Académie Ranson, where she studied under the painter Roger Bissière. Upon her return to Istanbul in 1929, she abandoned her academic figurative practice and turned towards expressionist figurativism, and enrolled at the Istanbul Academy of Fine Arts.

Şakir's brother Cevat, better known as the Fisherman of Halicarnassus, was a novelist. Under her tutelage, her sister Aliye Berger became a major modernist painter and engraver, while her niece Fureya Koral became a pioneering ceramic artist.

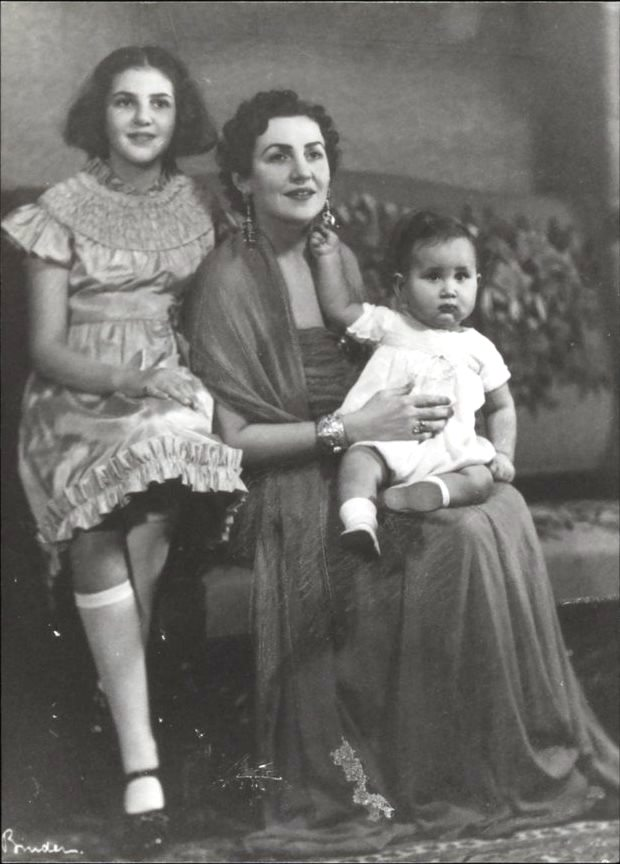
Princess Fahrelnissa Zeid with her children Shirin and Raad, Berlin (1937)

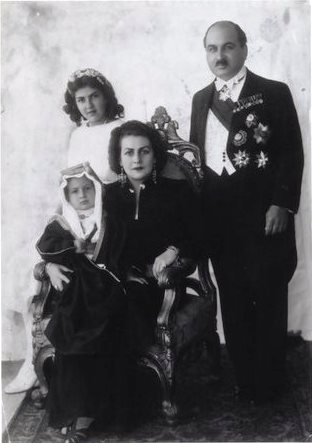
Fahrelnissa with her husband Prince Zeid bin Hussein, daughter Shirin, and son Raad, Baghdad (1938)

=== 1930–1944 ===
Şakir divorced Devrim in 1934, and married Prince Zeid bin Hussein of Iraq, who was appointed the first Ambassador of the Kingdom of Iraq to Germany in 1935. The couple moved to Berlin where Fahrelnissa hosted many social events in her role as an ambassador's wife. After the annexation of Austria in March 1938, Prince Zeid and his family were recalled to Iraq, taking up residence in Baghdad.

Fahrelnissa Zeid became depressed in Baghdad and on the advice of Viennese doctor Hans Hoff returned to Paris after a short time. She spent the next years of her life traveling between Paris, Budapest, and Istanbul, attempting to immerse herself in painting and recover. By 1941, she was back in Istanbul and focusing on her painting.

Zeid became involved with the D Group of Istanbul, an avant-garde group of painters working in the newly formed Turkish Republic. Although her association with the group was short-lived, working with the D Group from 1944 gave Zeid the confidence to begin exhibiting on her own.

=== 1945–1957 ===
In 1945, Zeid cleared out the parlour rooms of her apartment in Maçka, Istanbul, and held her first solo exhibition. In 1946, after two more solo exhibitions in İzmir in 1945 and in Istanbul in 1946, Zeid relocated to London where Prince Zeid Al-Hussein became the first Ambassador of the Kingdom of Iraq to the Court of St James's. Zeid continued to paint, turning a room in the Iraqi Embassy into her studio.

From 1947, Zeid's practice became more complex and her work transitioned from figurative painting to abstraction. She was influenced by the abstract styles coming out of Paris in the post-war period.

Queen Elizabeth visited Zeid's exhibition at Saint George's Gallery in London in 1948. Art critic Maurice Collis reviewed that exhibition, and he and Zeid became friends. The prominent French art critic and curator Charles Estienne became a major supporter of Zeid's work. She was part of the founding exhibition of the Nouvelle Ecole de Paris organised by Estienne in 1952 at the Galerie Babylone.

Over the next decade, living between London and Paris, Zeid created some of her strongest works, experimenting with monumental abstract canvases that immerse the viewer in kaleidoscopic universes through their heavy use of line and vibrant colour. Zeid exhibited at Galerie Dina Vierny in 1953, showing her most recent abstract works such as The Octopus of Triton, and Sargasso Sea. The exhibition travelled to the Institute of Contemporary Arts in London in 1954, making her the first woman of any nationality to exhibit at the modernist showcase. At the height of her career, she became friends with a group of international artists such as Jean-Michel Atlan, Jean Dubuffet and Serge Poliakoff, who experimented with gestural abstraction. Fahrelnissa Zeid also exhibited frequently alongside other members of the Nouvelle Ecole de Paris in small group exhibitions, as well as exhibiting at the Salon des Realites Nouvelles Salon des Réalités Nouvelles.

=== 1958–1991 ===
In 1958, Zeid persuaded her husband not to return to Baghdad as acting regent as he usually did while his great-nephew King Faisal II took a vacation. The couple went to their new holiday home on the island of Ischia in the Gulf of Naples. On 14 July 1958 there was a military coup in Iraq and the entire royal family was assassinated. Prince Zeid and his family narrowly escaped death, and they were given only 24 hours to vacate the Iraqi Embassy in London. The coup halted Zeid's career as a painter and hostess in London.

Zeid and her family moved into an apartment in Paris and at the age of fifty-seven, she cooked her first meal. The experience prompted her to begin painting on chicken bones, later creating sculptures from the bones cast in resin, called paléokrystalos. The 1960s were a period of both renewal and looking back for Zeid. She immersed herself in renewing her portrait practice alongside her abstract work. At the same time, she had two large-scale homecoming retrospectives in Turkey in 1964, in Istanbul and Ankara. She prepared for a large exhibition in Paris in the late 1960 after meeting André Malraux but it never happened after the dismissal by Malraux of Jacques Jaujard who coordinated with her, and the subsequent May 1968 May 68 events. Still Zeid continued exhibiting in Paris through 1972.

In the 1960s Zeid's youngest son, Prince Raad, married and moved to Amman, Jordan. In 1970, Prince Zeid died in Paris and Fahrelnissa Zeid moved to join her son in Amman in 1975. She founded The Royal National Jordanian Institute Fahrelnissa Zeid of Fine Arts in 1976, and for the next fifteen years until her death in 1991 taught and mentored a group of young women.

== Retrospectives and legacy ==
Museum Ludwig held Zeid's first retrospective in the west in 1990.

In October 2012, Bonhams auctioned a number of Zeid's paintings for a total of £2,021,838, setting a world record for the artist.

In 2017, Tate Modern in London organised a major retrospective of Fahrelnissa Zeid. According to an article in The Guardian, the exhibition aimed to lift the artist "out of obscurity to ensure that she does not become yet another female artist forgotten by history." The central gallery of the exhibition hosted large-scale, abstract paintings of Zeid from the late 1940s and 1950s including her five-meter work titled My Hell (1951). The last gallery was devoted to the portraits Zeid concentrated on in her last years in Amman, as well as resin sculptures. All the works in the exhibition were loaned from international collections and Tate Modern acquired one of the paintings, Untitled C, "so she can now be part of our narrative," according to Tate Modern Director Frances Morris. The exhibition traveled to Deutsche Bank KunstHalle in late 2017. Istanbul Modern lent eight works to the retrospective exhibition and also organised the exhibition Fahrelnissa Zeid in spring 2017 with works from its collection, focusing on works created between the 1940s and 1970s. Istanbul Modern director Levent Çalıkoğlu stated, "The belated interest of Western museums and art community in Zeid’s works. . . is restoring the value she deserves."

In 2019 Zeid was commemorated with a Google Doodle. Zeid's work was included in the 2021 exhibition Women in Abstraction at the Centre Pompidou.

In her lifetime and even after her death, Zeid's work was beset by orientalist assessments that she fused Islamic and Byzantine influences with modernism. The 2017 exhibitions. which strove to place her within the narratives of the transnational abstract practices of mid-twentieth century art, were criticised for their ‘Eurocentric’ framing. The concurrent publication of the artist's biography Fahrelnissa Zeid: Painter of Inner Worlds, written by Adila Laïdi-Hanieh, a former student of Zeid's, was seen as upsetting those narratives that explained her art from an ‘Orientalist’ perspective in a way that quite disengaged from the artist herself. Zeid often expressed her modernist sensibilities. Her inclinations were towards a more universalist, elemental vision of art-making. In 1952 she told the art critic Julien Alvard that:” I am a means to an end. I transpose the cosmic, magnetic vibrations that rule us… I am not a pole, a centre, a myself, a somebody. I act as a channel for that which should and can be transposed by me … painting is for me, flow, movement, speed, encounters, departures, enlargement that knows no limits."

Adila Laïdi-Hanieh's Fahrelnissa Zeid: Painter of Inner Worlds offers a revisionist and definitive account of both her life and career, and emphasises the importance of her immersion in European culture and her shifting mental state on her artistic vision and constantly renewing bold practice. It redefines Fahrelnissa Zeid as one of the most important modernists of the twentieth century.

Zeid's colourful family life is described in her daughter Shirin Devrim's book, A Turkish Tapestry: The Shakirs of Istanbul, published in 1994.

== Major works ==
- Fight Against Abstraction, 1947
- Resolved Problems, 1948
- My Hell, 1951
- Towards a Sky, 1953
- Someone from the Past, 1980
