= Museum of the Princes' Islands =

- Adalar Müzesi
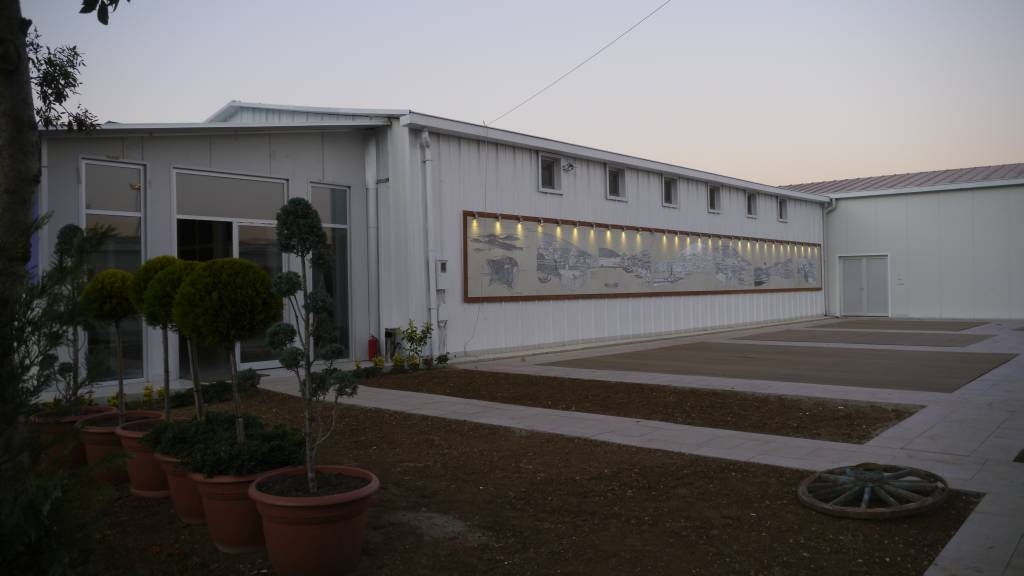
- A view of the museum's building.

- Museum of the Princes' Islands
- Established: 10 September 2010; 15 years ago
- Coordinates: 40°51′22″N 29°07′29″E
- Owner: Adalar Municipality
- Website: adalarmuzesi.com

Museum of the Princes' Islands (Turkish: Adalar Müzesi) is a museum on Büyükada of Princes' Islands (Turkish: Adalar) in Istanbul, Turkey dedicated to the past of the Princes' Islands.

== Location and history ==
The museum is situated in the eastern side of Büyükada, the biggest island of the archipelago, off the Anatolian side of İstanbul in the Sea of Marmara at 40°51′22″N 29°07′29″E.

The museum was established by Adalar Municipality, Adalar District Governorship and a local foundation in the scope of European Capital of Culture project, and was opened on September 10,2 2010. The museum is housed in 800 m^{2} (8,600 sq ft) closed area and 1,300 m^{2} (14,000 sq ft) open space.

== Exhibitions ==
In the entrance hall, there are aerial photographs and the basic information of Adalar. Next, there are items on display about the biological life around the islands. The fossil of an almost 400 million years old fish species Dunkleosteus, which was discovered by English geologist W. S. Swan in the 1860s inside sandstone formation in the southwest of Büyükada, is an important example of this collection. Some of the topics are; a geology panel, birds of the islands, notes about the islands from the ancient age authors, first life forms in the Islands, early island dwellers. Next comes later eras such as "From detention colony to resort area", "Adalar as a suburb of İstanbul", "Architecture of Adalar", "Demographics and Migration", "Transportation", "Rowing and water sports", "Food culture of Adalar", "Musicians from Adalar", "Adalar re-explored".

== Other sections ==
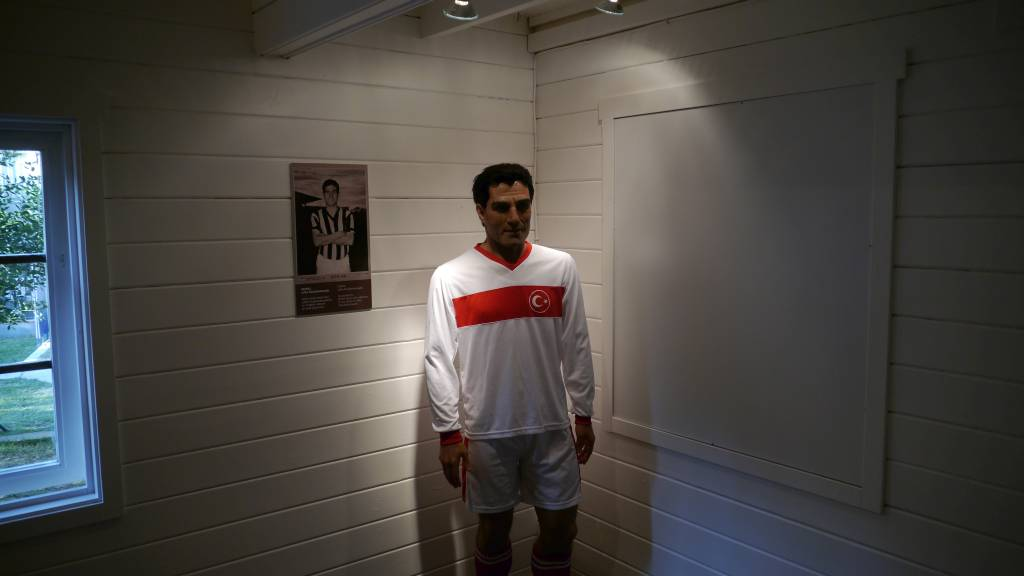
Lefter Küçükandonyadis wax sculpture in the museum.

The museum has a library with a database about the history of Adalar, maps, Ottoman archives, celebrity from Adalar etc. There are also workshops and children quarters. According to museum page, the number of written documents is 20,000 and the photographs 6,000. A section was added for the popular football player from Büyükada, Lefter Küçükandonyadis (1924–2012), on 24 June 2012, just a few months after his death.
