= Mehmet Emin Koral =

Mehmet Emin Koral 1318-Ağ. Top 1
- Born: 1881; Constantinople (Istanbul), Ottoman Empire
- Died: 12 August 1959 (aged 77–78); Istanbul, Turkey
- Burial place: Büyükada
- Military career
- Allegiance: Ottoman Empire; Turkey
- Service years: Ottoman: 1905–1922; Turkey: 11 January 1922 – 26 August 1929
- Rank: Ferik
- Commands: 17th Division, 59th Division, Vice chief of the 15th division of Inspectorate of the Heavy Artillery in General headquarters, 61st Division, Bosporus Fortified Area Command, Provisional Division, 2nd division of the General Staff; Chief of Staff of the First Army, İzmir Fortified Area Command, IV Corps
- Conflicts: Italo-Turkish War; Balkan Wars; First World War; Turkish War of Independence

Mehmet Emin Koral (1881 in Constantinople (Istanbul) – 12 August 1959 in Istanbul) was an officer of the Ottoman Army and a general of the Turkish Army.

== See also ==
- List of high-ranking commanders of the Turkish War of Independence
