= Aliye Berger =

Turkish artist (1903–1974)

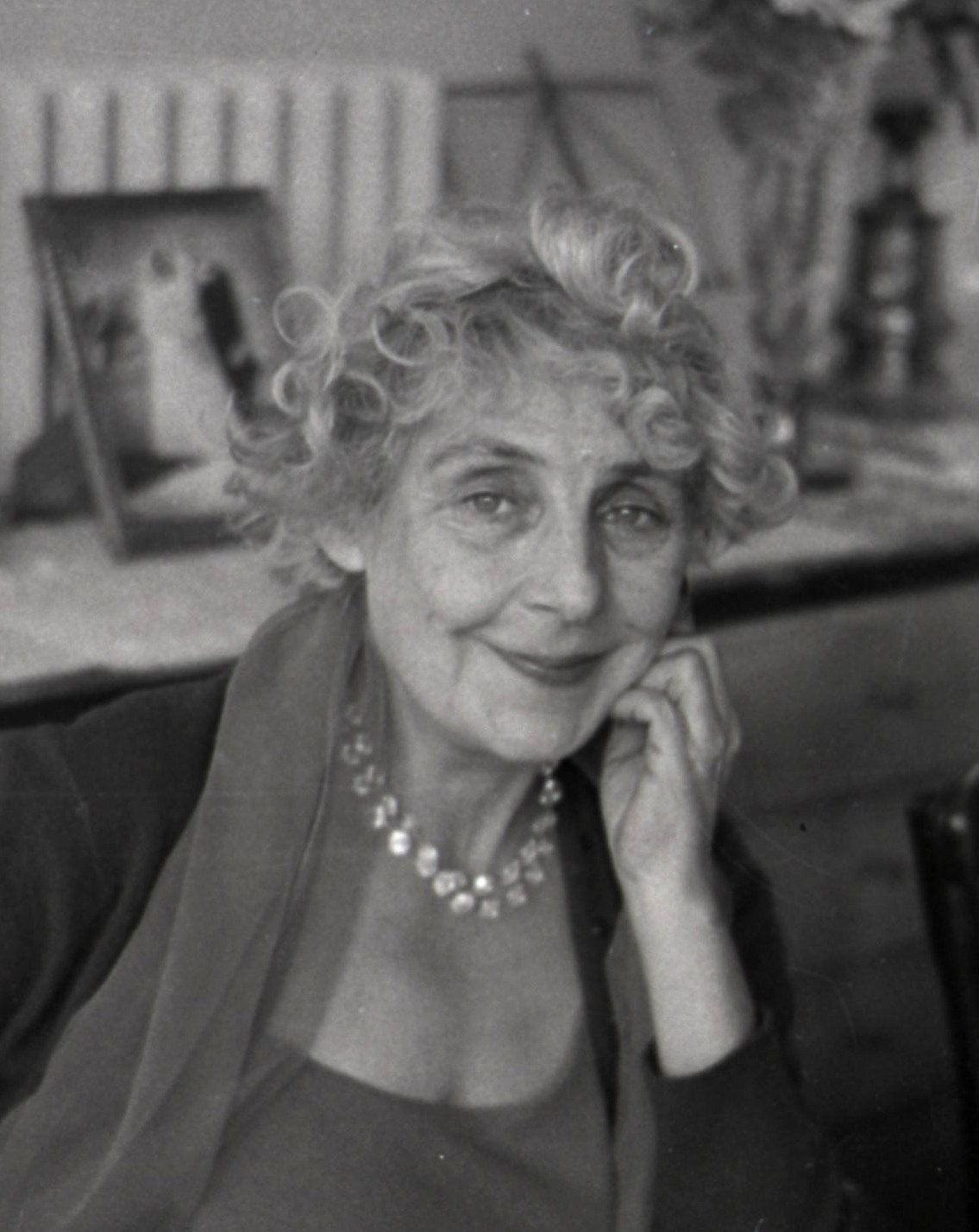
- Aliye Berger in 1965.
- Born: 24 December 1903; Büyükada, Istanbul, Ottoman Empire
- Died: 9 August 1974 (aged 70); Büyükada, Istanbul, Turkey
- Known for: Graphics, engraving, painting
- Spouse: Karl Berger
- Parent: Mehmed Şakir Pasha (father)
- Relatives: Cevat Şakir Kabaağaçlı (brother); Fahrelnissa Zeid (sister); Ahmed Cevad Pasha (uncle)

Aliye Berger (24 December 1903 – 9 August 1974) was a Turkish engraver and painter. She is one of the first engravers of Turkey. She is known for her expressionist engravings and winning the painting competition of Yapı Kredi Bank in 1954.

== Biography ==
Berger was born on 24 December 1903 in Büyükada, Istanbul, Ottoman Empire. Her father was Kabaağaçlı Şakir Paşa and mother Giritli Sare İsmet Hanım. Her sister was the artist Fehrelnissa Zeid and her brother was the author Cevat Şakir Kabaağaçlı.

Berger originally studied painting and piano lessons while attending the Lycée Notre Dame de Sion. In 1947 she married Carl Berger, her music teacher, but he died less than six months later.

Berger then followed her sister to London, where she began to study engraving and sculpture, mentored by the artist John Buckland Wright. On her return to Turkey in 1951 Berger held her first exhibition in Istanbul, showcasing over 100 works. Her oil painting "Güneşin Doğuşu" ("Sun Rising") won an international competition in 1954, and she took second prize at the 2nd Tehran Biennial the following year. Berger worked prolifically in the following decades.

Aliye Berger died on 9 August 1974 in Büyükada, Istanbul, Turkey. She was buried in Büyükada Cemetery, on Princes Islands, Istanbul, Turkey.

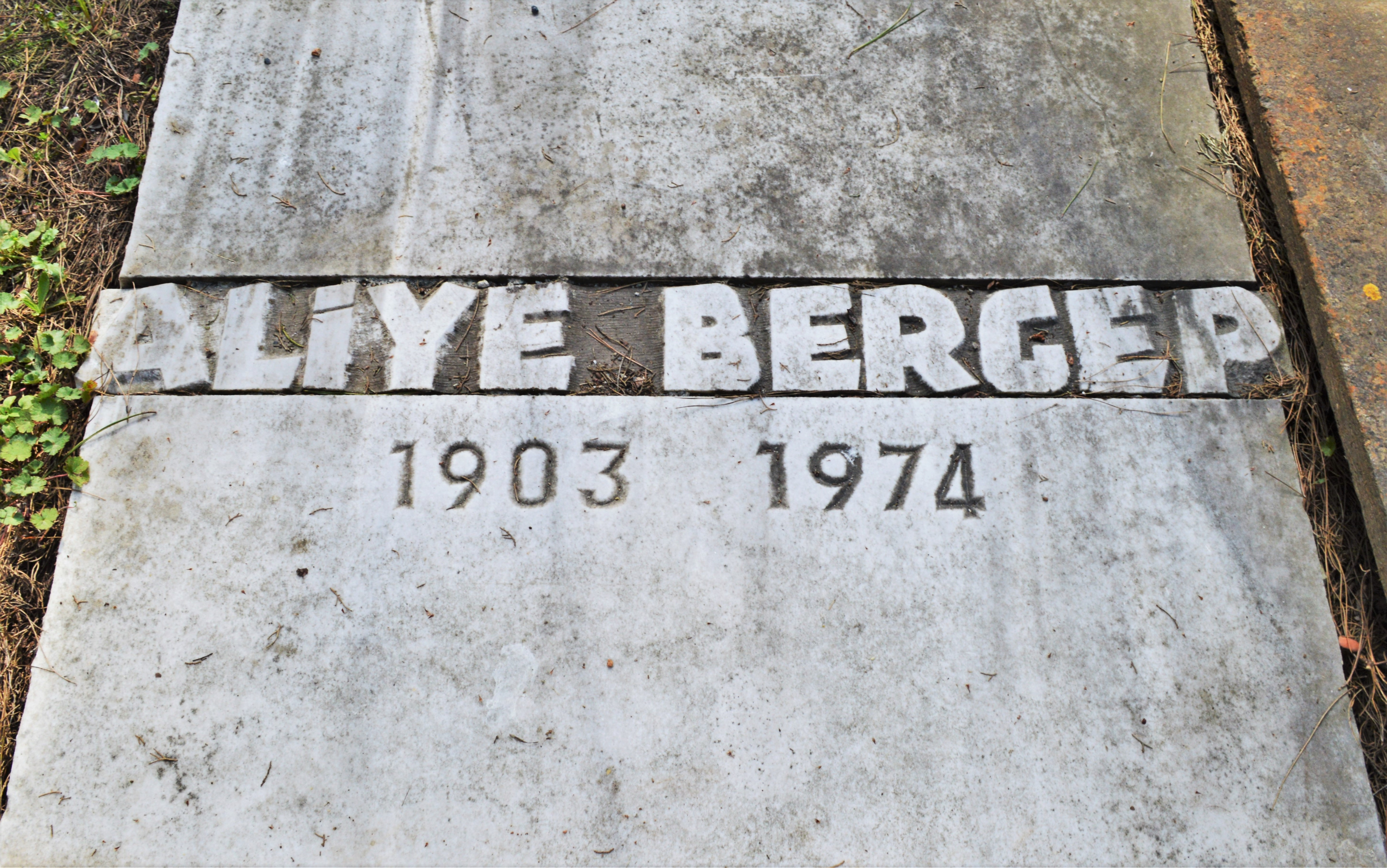
Aliye Berger's gravestone in Büyükada Cemetery, Princes Islands, Istanbul, Turkey

== Commemoration ==
A posthumous retrospective of Berger's work was held at the Istanbul Academy of Fine Arts in 1975. Another exhibition was organised by Yapı Kredi Bank in 1988. Four of Berger's works are exhibited in the Istanbul State Art and Sculpture Museum, and three in the Albertina Museum. Her c. 1960 work, Untitled Dervishes, is held by the Metropolitan Museum of Art in New York.

Aliye Berger was the subject of a Google Doodle on 24 December 2020, on what would have been her 117th birthday.
