= Büyükada =

Island in Turkey

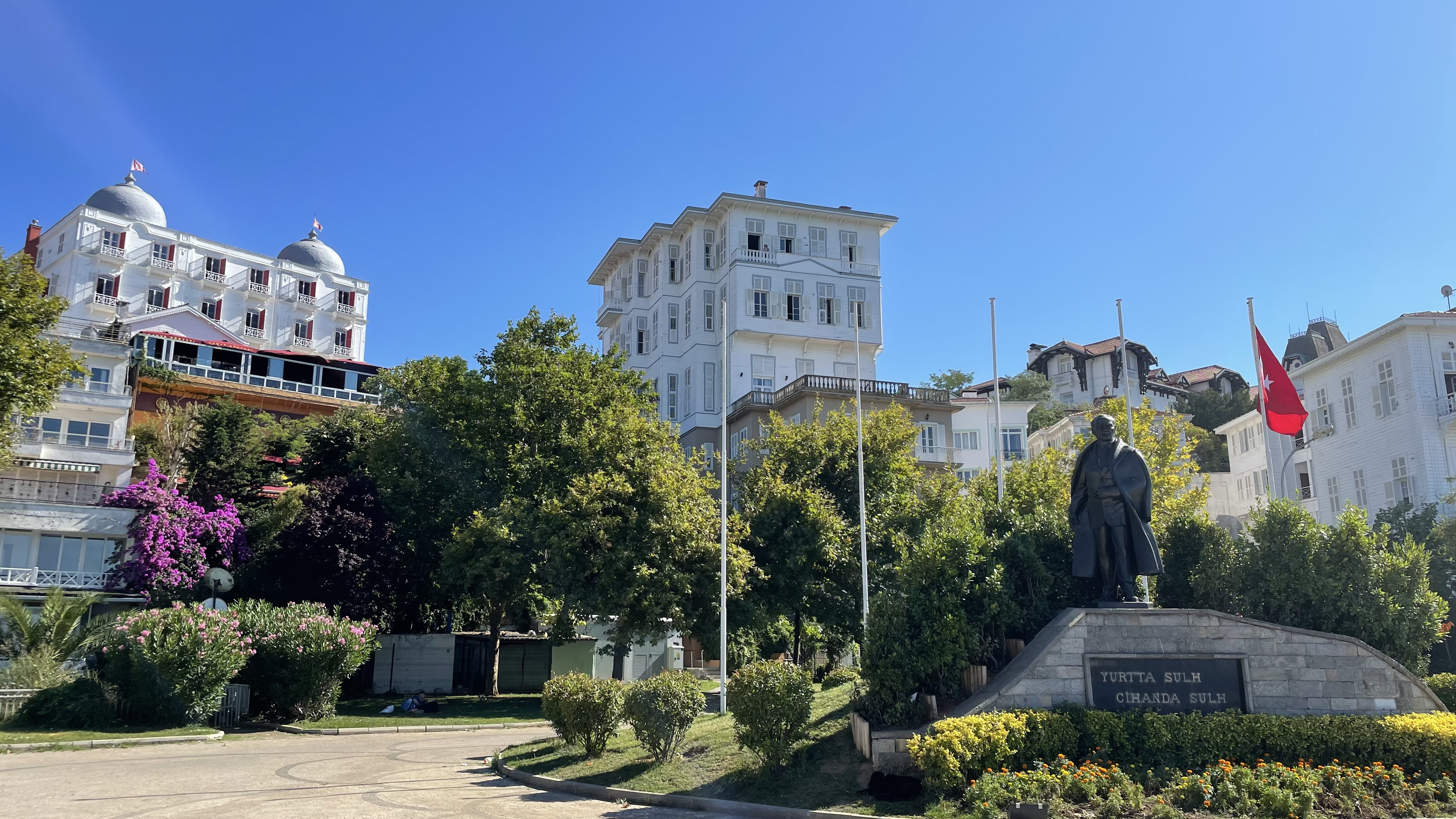
- One of the main squares of the island, with the statue of Mustafa Kemal Atatürk.

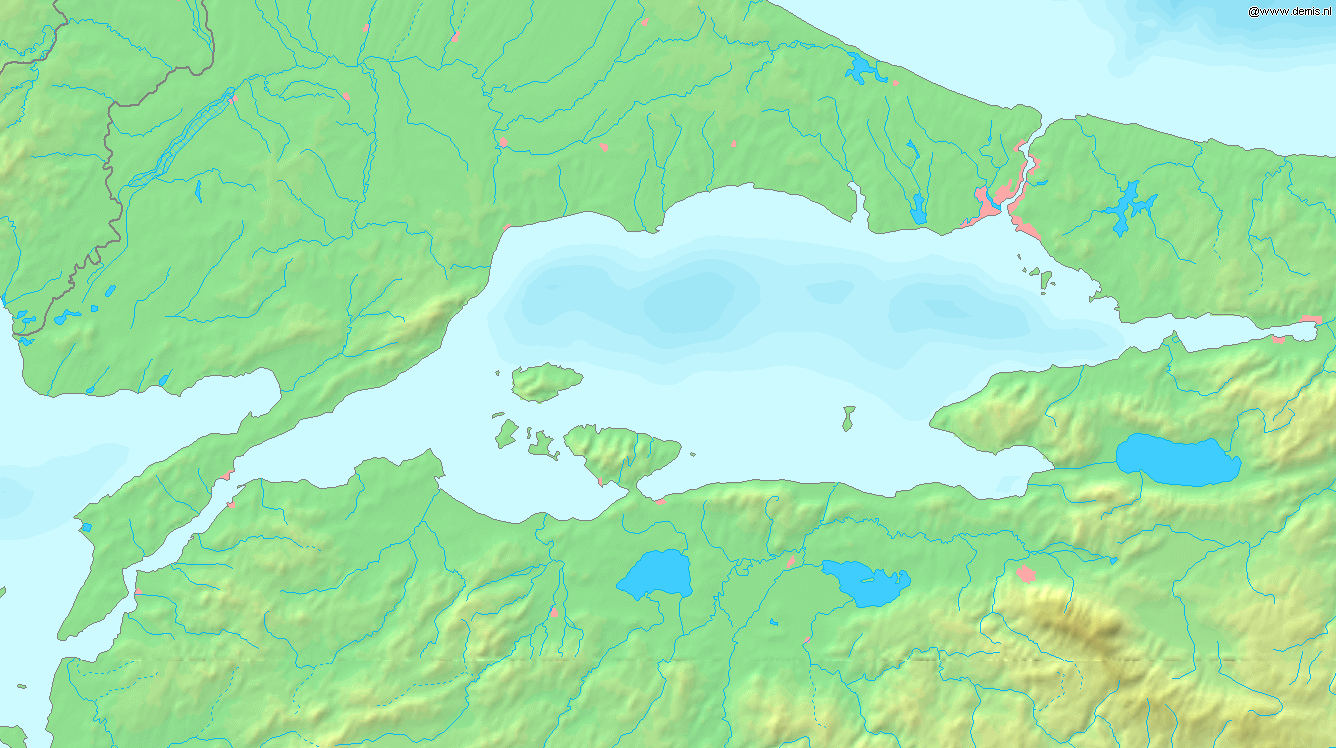
- Location within Turkey Location within Sea of Marmara Location within Istanbul
- Coordinates: 40°51′28″N 29°07′12″E
- Country: Turkey
- Region: Marmara
- Province: Istanbul
- District: Adalar

Area
  - Total: 5.4 km^{2} (2.1 sq mi)

Population (2018)
  - Total: 8,586
  - Density: 1,600/km^{2} (4,100/sq mi)
- Time zone: UTC+3 (TRT)
- Postal code: 34970
- Area code: 0216

Büyükada (Greek: Πρίγκηπος or Πρίγκιπος, rendered Prinkipos or Prinkipo), meaning "Big Island" in Turkish, is the largest of the Princes' Islands in the Sea of Marmara, near Istanbul, with an area of about 2 square miles (5 square kilometres). It is made up of the Maden and Nizam neighbourhoods in the Adalar (Islands) district of Istanbul Province, Turkey.

During the first half of the 20th century, the island was popular with prosperous Greeks and Armenians as a refuge from the summer heat of Istanbul. Nowadays the island's demographics are more similar to a typical suburb of mainland Istanbul.

Historically, many residents of Büyükada were fishermen. However, by the late 2010s tourism to Büyükada swelled enormously as it became a favourite day-trip destination for visitors from greenery-starved Arab countries in particular. The surge in tourism was a major factor in bringing to an end the tradition of using phaetons as the only transport on the island in 2020.

Visitors have been writing about Büyükada since the Turkish travel writer Evliya Çelebi recorded in his Seyahatname (Book of Travels) that there were 200 Greek houses on the island in 1640 and that it was ringed with dalyan fishermen. In 1884 the French historian Gustave Schlumberger published Les Iles des Princes, describing his visit to the archipelago. Ernest Mamboury recorded the sites of the island in his Les Iles des Princes, published in 1943 and Jak Deleon updated his work in 2003 in his Büyükada: A Guide to the Monuments. In 1929 Leon Trotsky settled on the island after being exiled from the Soviet Union; after leaving the island in 1933, he wrote an essay called Farewell to Prinkipo. In 1997 Çelik Gülersoy, who had worked to restore some of the island's buildings, published Büyükada Dün (Büyükada Yesterday). In 2007 John Freely's The Princes' Islands exhaustively listed the historic mansions on the island. In 2009 the poet and translator Joachim Sartorius published an exquisite short travelogue called The Princes' Islands: Istanbul's Archipelago which mainly focused on Büyükada. In 2023, Yapı Kredi Yayınları published Büyükada – The Moris Danon Collection by Büke Uras, which documents a period from the second quarter of the 19th century to the middle of 20th century with photographs and supporting text.

One of the most famous residents who was featured in a Netflix movie of his life was Lefter Küçükandonyadis, a Turkish professional footballer of Greek descent. He is recognised as one of the greatest strikers to play for Fenerbahçe and Turkey.

The island is accessible by Şehir Hatları ferries from Eminönü and Kabataş on the European side of Istanbul and from Kadıköy and Bostancı on the Asian side of the city.

== Geography ==
Büyükada is 4.3 km (2.6 miles) long and 1.3 km (0.8 miles) wide. The centre of the island is dominated by two peaks. The one nearest to the ferry landing is the Hill of Jesus (Turkish: İsa Tepesi), which is 164 m (538 ft) high. The second is the Great Hill (Turkish: Yücetepe) which is 202 m (663 ft) high. The island has several small strips of sand and pebble beach too, the most popular being Yörük Ali Plajı near Dilburnu.

Most development on the island is on its northern side with the south still largely wooded.

== History ==
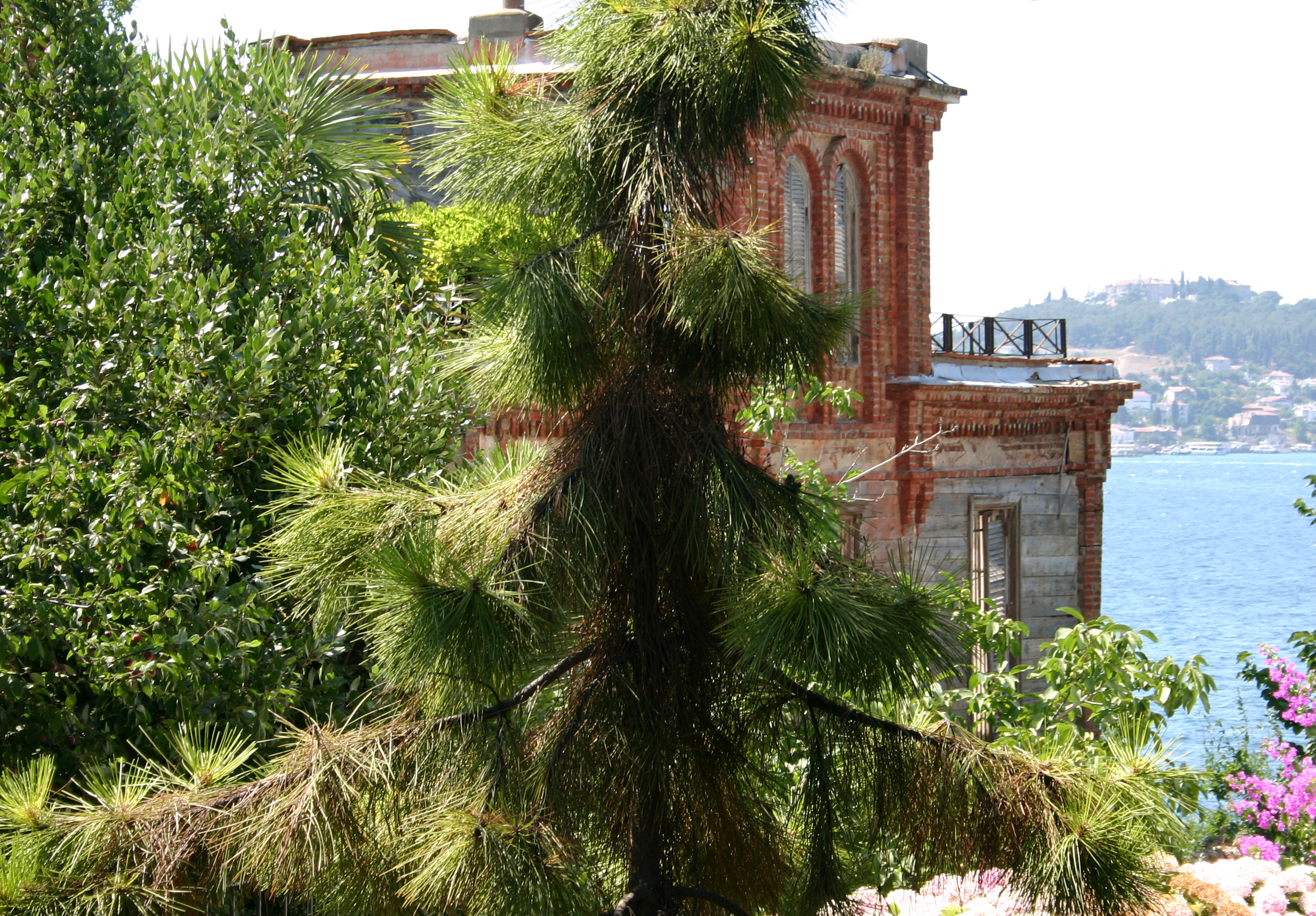
House where Leon Trotsky lived in exile (April 1929 – July 1933) as it appeared in 2006.

=== Byzantine era ===
During the period of Byzantine rule the Princes' Islands became a place where rulers founded churches and monasteries but where they also dumped their enemies to prevent them from plotting to harm them. The Byzantine Emperor Justin II was the first of the rulers who is known to have built a convent (as well as a palace) on Prinkipo in C.E. 569. This was expanded by Empress Eirene and soon began to serve as a place of exile for the Byzantine empresses Irene, Euphrosyne, Theophano, Zoe and Anna Dalassena.

=== Later history ===
Prinkipo was one of the last places that the Ottomans managed to seize from the Byzantine. It then settled down as a sleepy backwater until 1846 when the first ferry service made it easily accessible from mainland Constantinople/Istanbul whereupon it became an increasingly popular summer retreat for wealthier city residents. Most of its Greek residents left in the population exchange of 1923 or after the pogrom of 1955 and the expulsion order of 1966. Many of the Armenians were driven out in 1924. Just a few Jews still live on the island.

At one time iron mining took place on the island in the area now called Maden (Mine). International tourism to the Princes' Islands was relatively slow to take off but by 2015 was becoming the dominant economic factor.

== Transport on the island ==
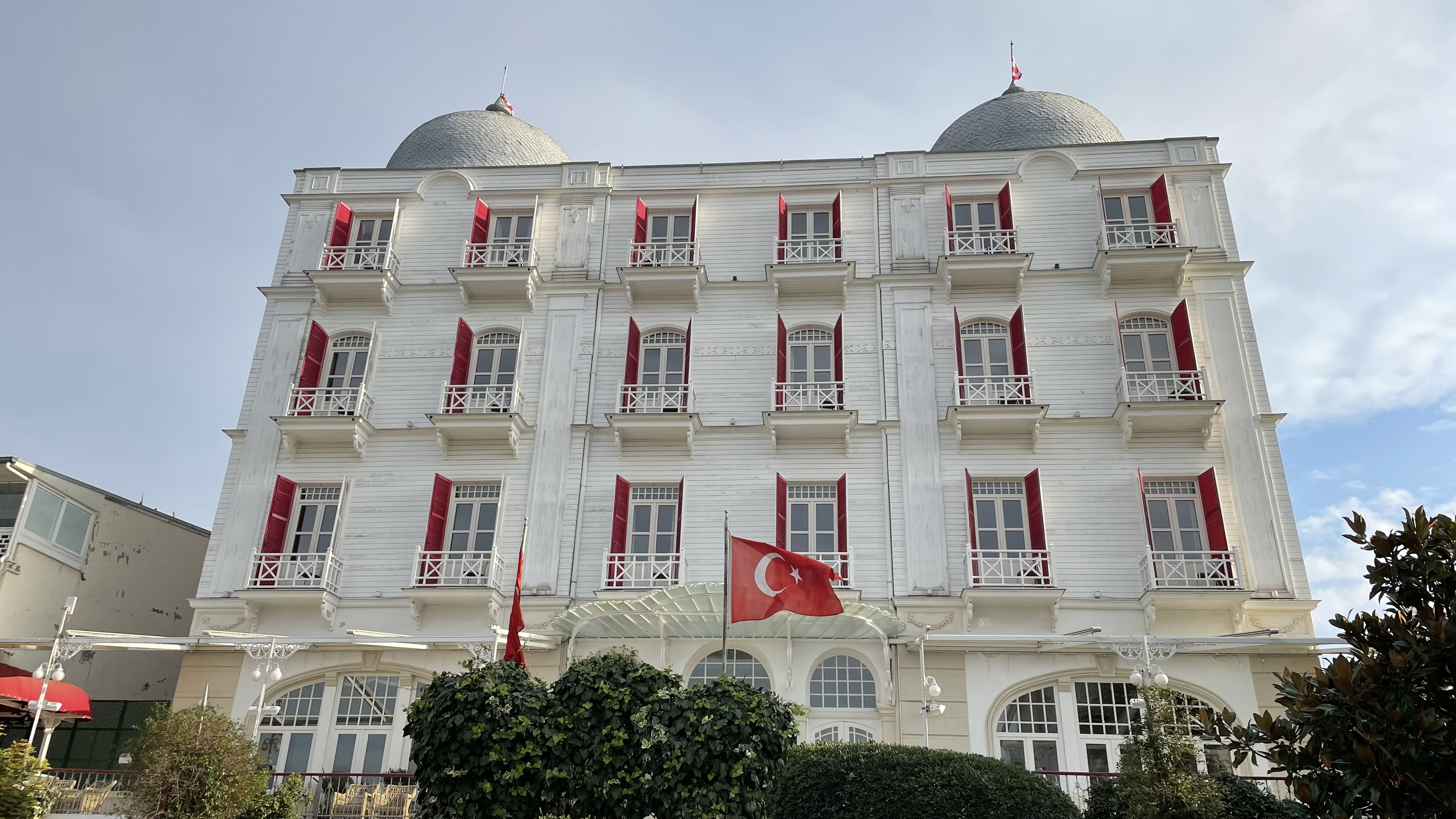
Splendid Palace Hotel (1908) near the Büyükada ferry terminal.

Until 2020 the only transportation on Büyükada (as on the other inhabited Princes' islands) had been horse-drawn phaetons (fayton). However, the explosion of tourism on the island had made this increasingly unsustainable and, under pressure from animal-rights activists, the decision was made to replace the horses with electric vehicles, bringing to an end a tradition that had made the islands unique in Turkey.

The introduction of electric buses on the island prompted protests from local residents who see them as a threat to the island's pedestrianized areas.

== Places of interest ==
By far the most important attraction for tourists on Büyükada is the Greek Orthodox monastery of Hagios Georgios Koudonas (St George of the Bells) on Yüceptepe, which was probably founded in the 10th century although what remains on the site now dates from the mid-18th to 19th centuries. The monastery's name recalls an early 17th-century legend according to which a shepherd boy watching his flocks heard the sound of bells coming from underground, dug down into the earth and uncovered an icon of St George that had been buried to protect it from the Fourth Crusaders in 1204. A copy of the icon can be seen in the monastery church although the original is now in the Ptriarchate church in Fener. The monastery now consists of half a dozen buildings spread across three levels and is he focus of an annual pilgrimage every April. Traditionally standard phaeton tours used to bring visitors to the foot of the rocky path leading up to the monastery but these ceased to operate in 2020. The panoramic view back to mainland Istanbul from the monastery is reason enough for a visit.

A second, less frequently visited Greek Orthodox monastery dedicated to Sotiros Christos (Christ the Saviour) stands on the top of İsa Tepesi. Although it, too, dates back to Byzantine times, most of what a modern visitor sees is work of the mid-19th century.

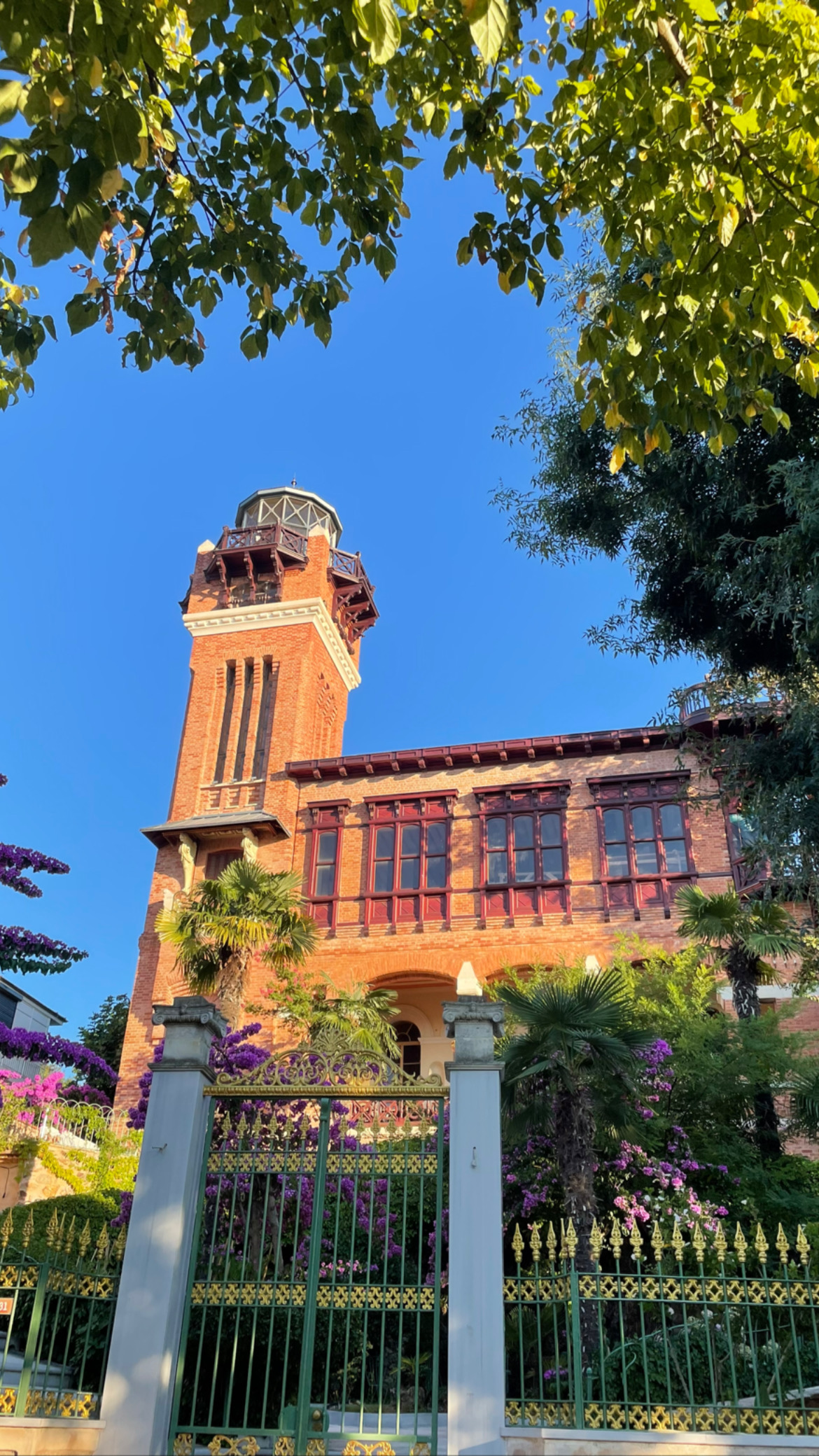
Villa in Büyükada

Also on İsa Tepesi is what should be the pride and joy of the island but is instead on its very last legs, the huge Greek Orthodox Orphanage (Turkish: Rum Yetimhanesi) believed to be the largest wooden construction in Europe and the second largest in the world. Originally intended to be a casino, it was built for a French company in 1898 and was designed by the Levantine architect Alexander Vallaury. After Sultan Abdülhamid II refused to allow its use as a casino, it was bought by a woman who donated it to the Patriarchate to serve as an orphanage which it did until 1964 except during the First World War when it was used by the Kuleli Military School. The building was given back to the Patriarchate by the state in 2010 but nothing was done to protect it from decay. In 2021 plans to restore the building were finally announced. In the meantime it is off-limits to visitors.

There are several churches on the island although they are not always accessible to visitors. These are the Greek Orthodox Churches of the Panagia (Virgin Mary) and Hagios Demetrios (St Dimitri), the Franciscan Church of San Pacifico and the Armenian Church of Surp Astvadzadzin Verapolium.

One synagogue, Hesed Le Avram, still survives on the island although it is only open in the summer. The Hamidiye Mosque was built for Abdul Hamid II in 1893.

The island is still home to many beautiful 19th-century mansions especially along Çankaya Caddesi, which has been described as "one of the most beautiful streets in the world". Among the best known mansions are the Con Pasa Köşkü, the Yelkencizade Köşkü, the Hacopolo Köşkü, the Fabiato Köşkü and the Mizzi Köşkü.

Opened in 2010, the Museum of the Princes' Islands (Turkish: Adalar Muzesi) tells the story of the islands' people as much as of its buildings.

In the 19th century the island had several well known hotels. The most conspicuous survivor is the Splendid Palace Hotel (1911) which still lords it over the waterfront with its two domes which once covered water cisterns.

The pretty ferry terminal was designed by Armenian architect Mihran Azaryan in First National Architectural style in 1899 and started service in 1915. It once housed the island's cinema. Not far inland is a clock tower erected in 1923, the year of the founding of the Turkish Republic. Beside it is Fayton Meydanı which was, until 2020, filled with phaetons and their horses waiting to take visitors on a tour of the island.

== St George's Day Pilgrimage ==
Every year on St George's Day (23 April) visitors flock to the island to take part in a pilgrimage to the monastery of Hagios Georgios Koudanas on Yücetepe. Both Christians and Muslims take part in arcane rituals such as winding thread all the way along the path leading to the monastery. Since the date coincides with Turkey's Children and National Sovereignty Day public holiday (and sometimes with the Easter tourism period) the crowds attending can be enormous.

== Notable people ==
- Lefter Küçükandonyadis, Turkish football player.
- The artist Fahrelnissa Zeid was born on the island in 1901. Her brother Cevat Şakir Kabaağaçlı ('the Fisherman of Halikarnassos') also spent much of his youth on the island.
- After his deportation from the Soviet Union, Leon Trotsky settled on what was then Prinkipo in April 1929 and lived there until July 1933. While there, Trotsky lived in a house called the Yanaros mansion which is now in ruins.
- Pope John XXIII (Angelo Giuseppe Roncali), the "Turkish Pope", lived here as papal nuncio in 1933-34
- Con Paşa AKA Trasivolos Yannaros who established the first ferry services to the island
- Aliye Berger, Turkish artist
- Füreyya, Turkish ceramicist
- Reşat Nuri Güntekin, Turkish writer
- Mîna Urgan, Turkish writer

== Gallery ==
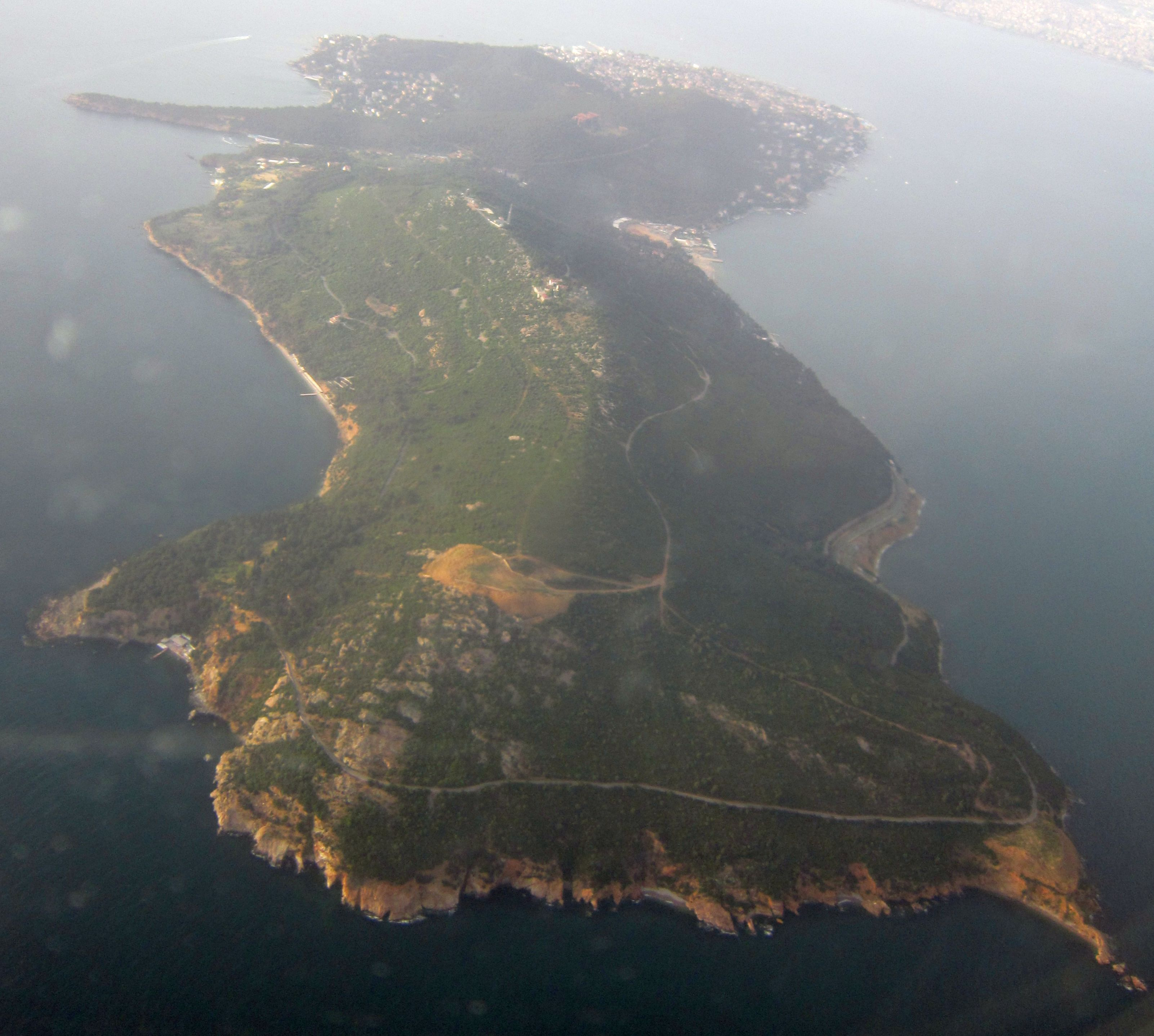
Aerial view of the island

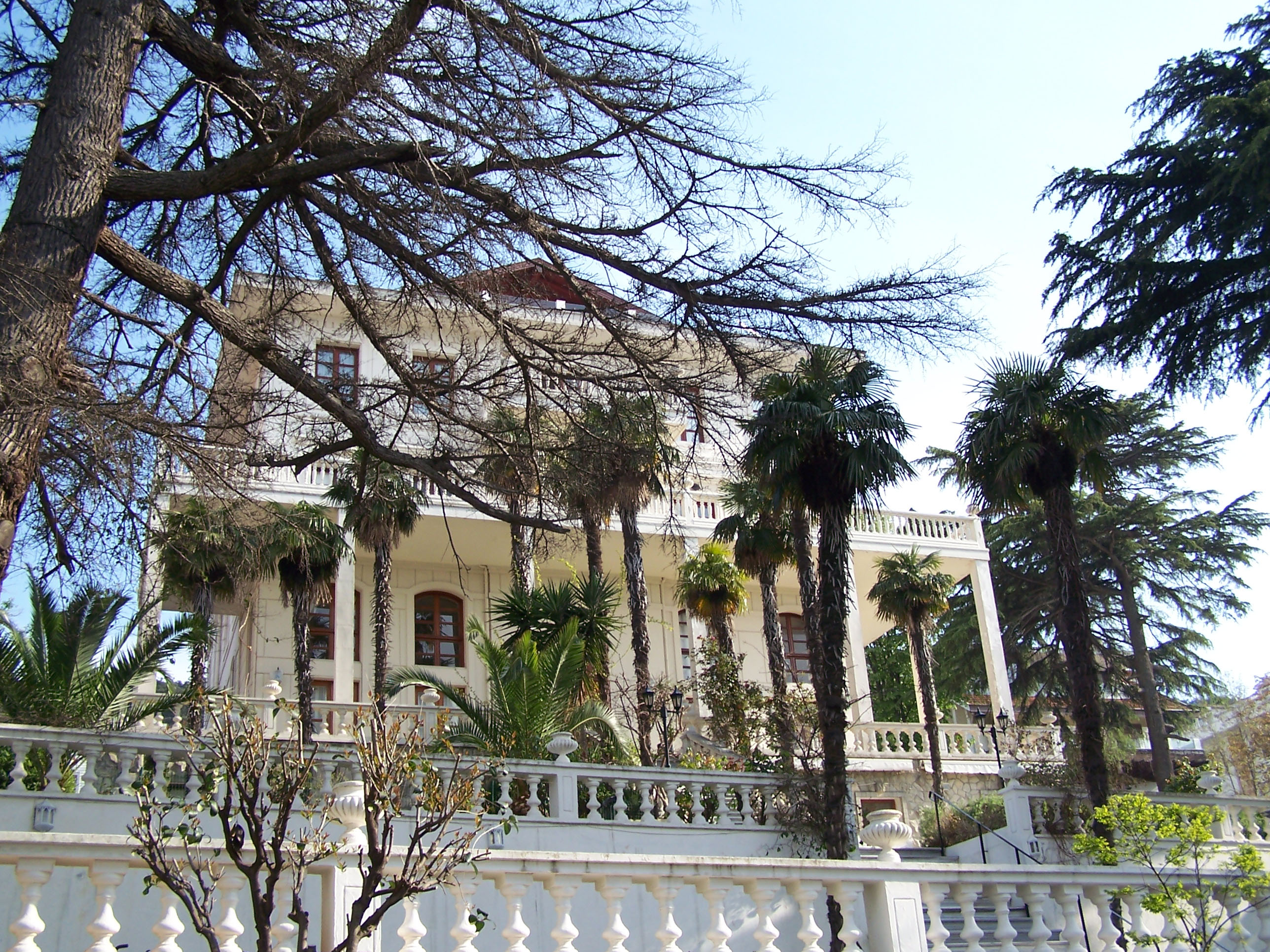
A typical Ottoman era mansion in Büyükada

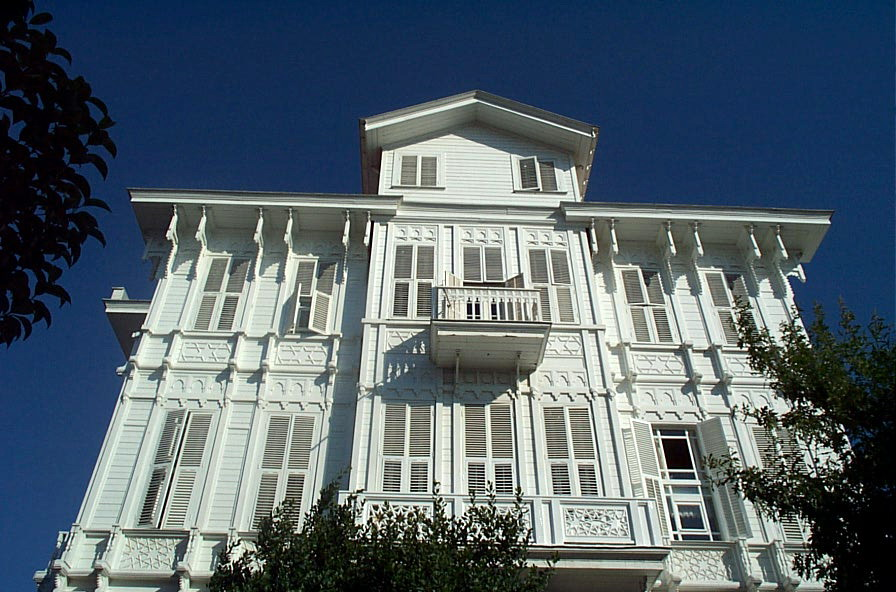
A typical Ottoman era mansion in Büyükada

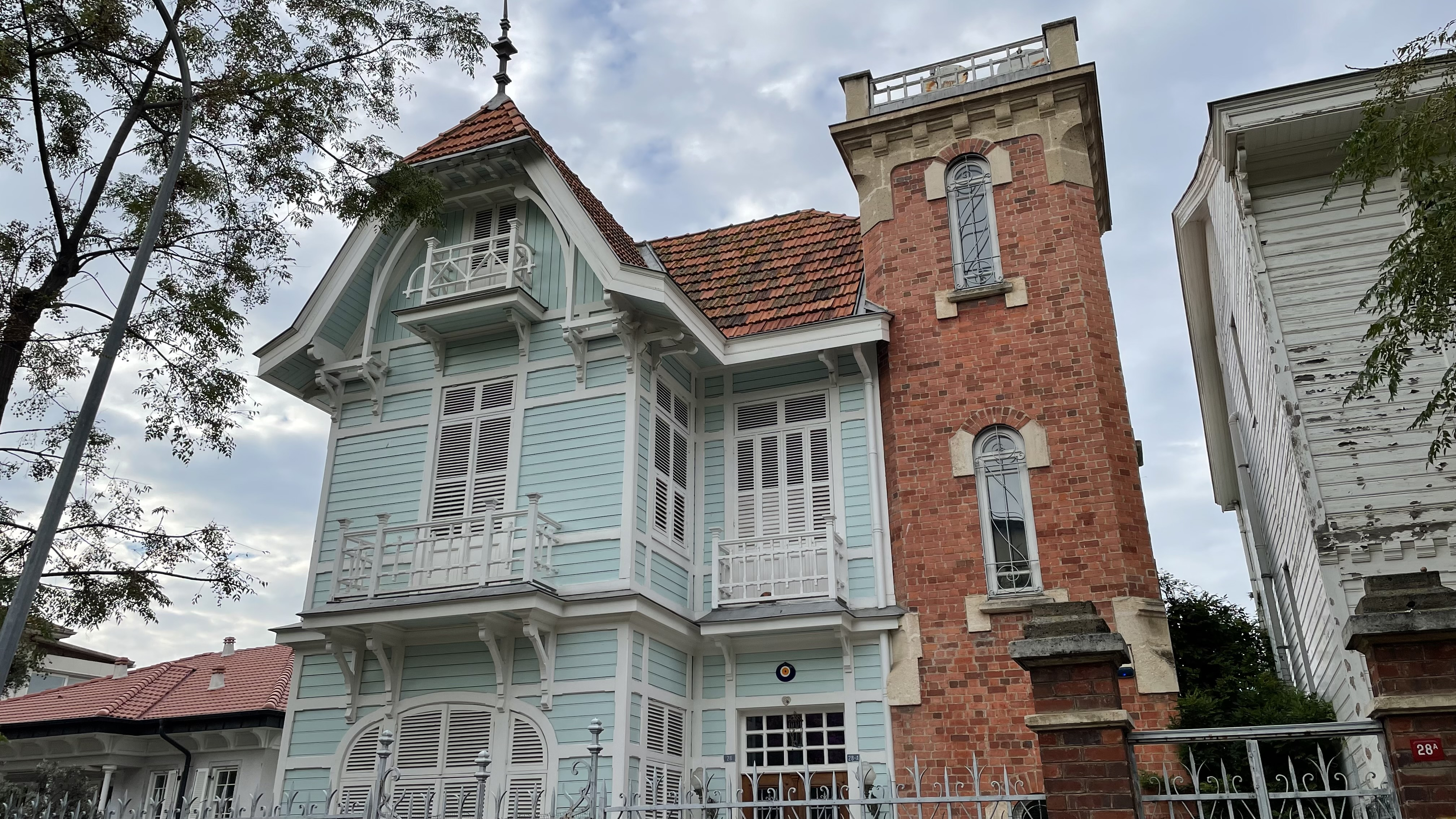
Ottoman era house in the streets of Büyükada

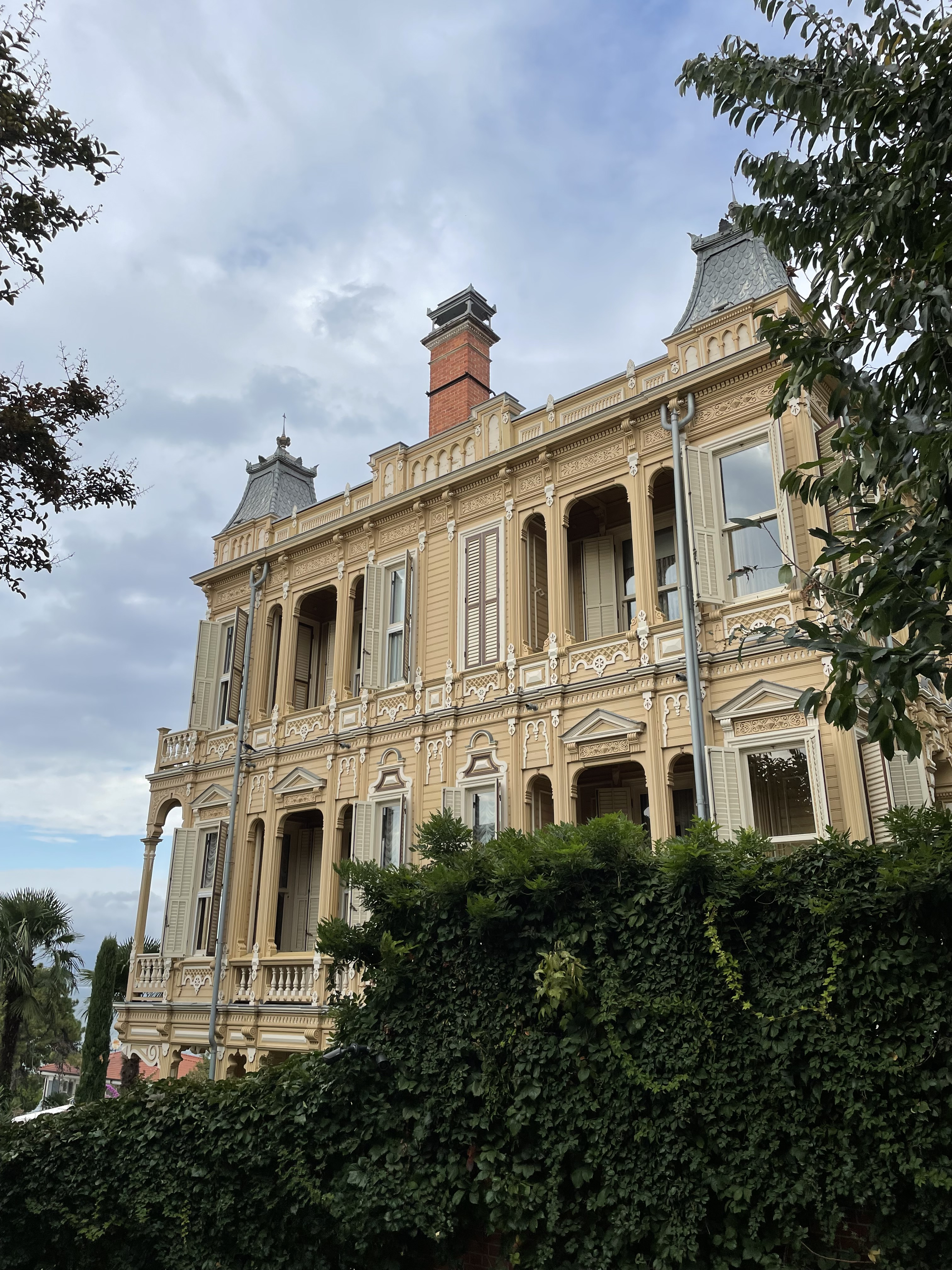
Ottoman era house in the streets of Büyükada

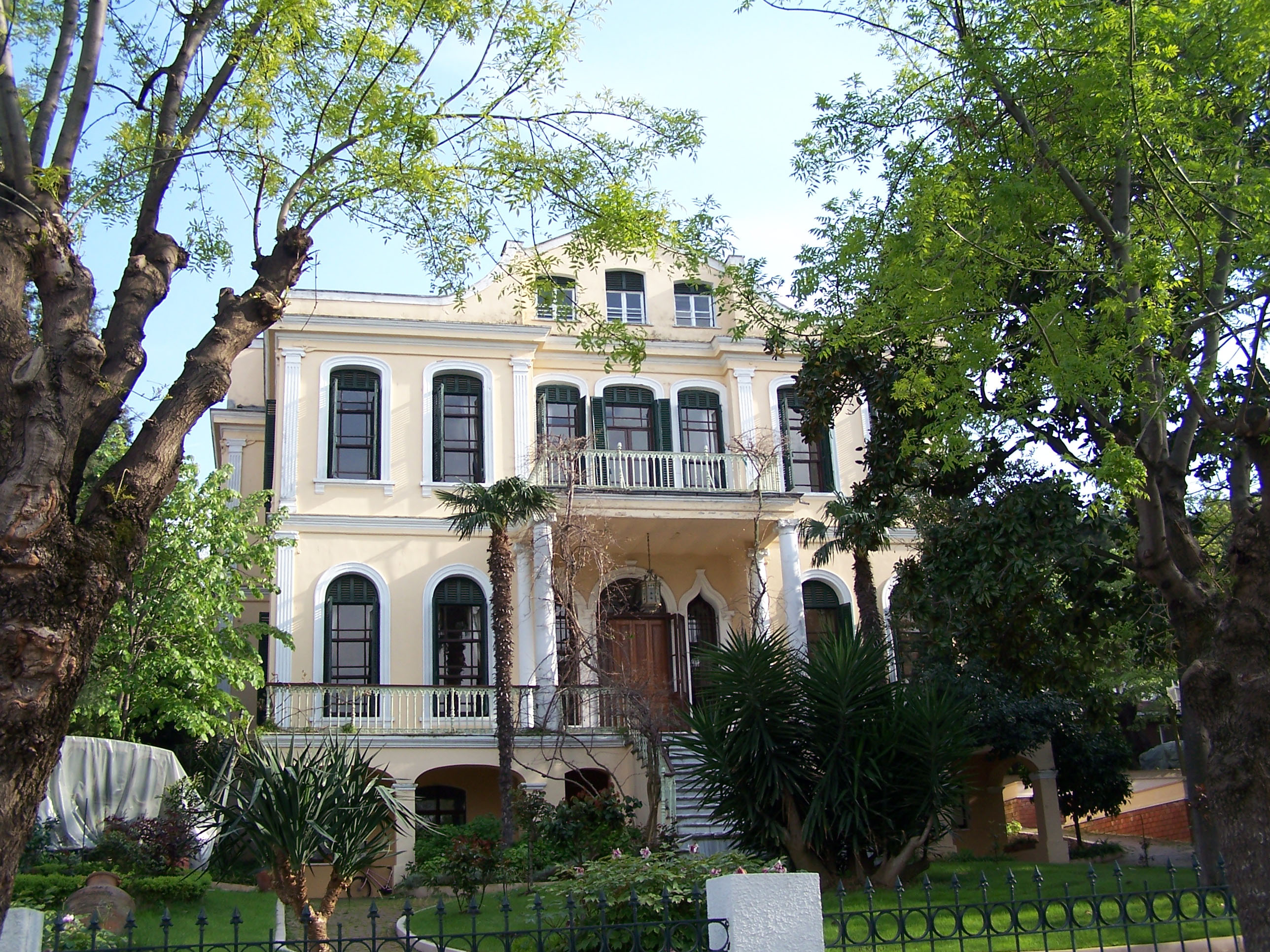
Ottoman era houses in the streets of Büyükada

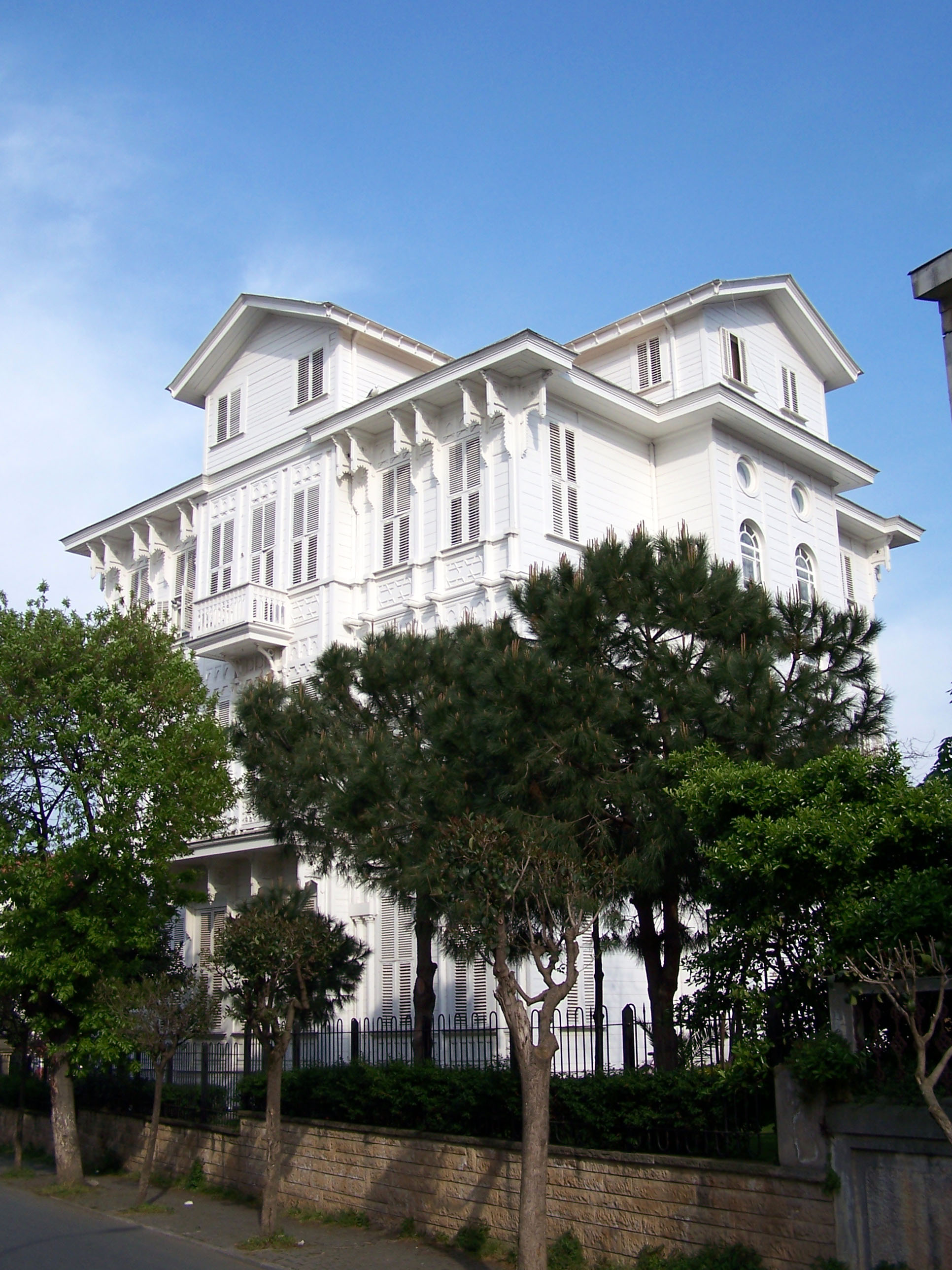
Ottoman era houses in the streets of Büyükada

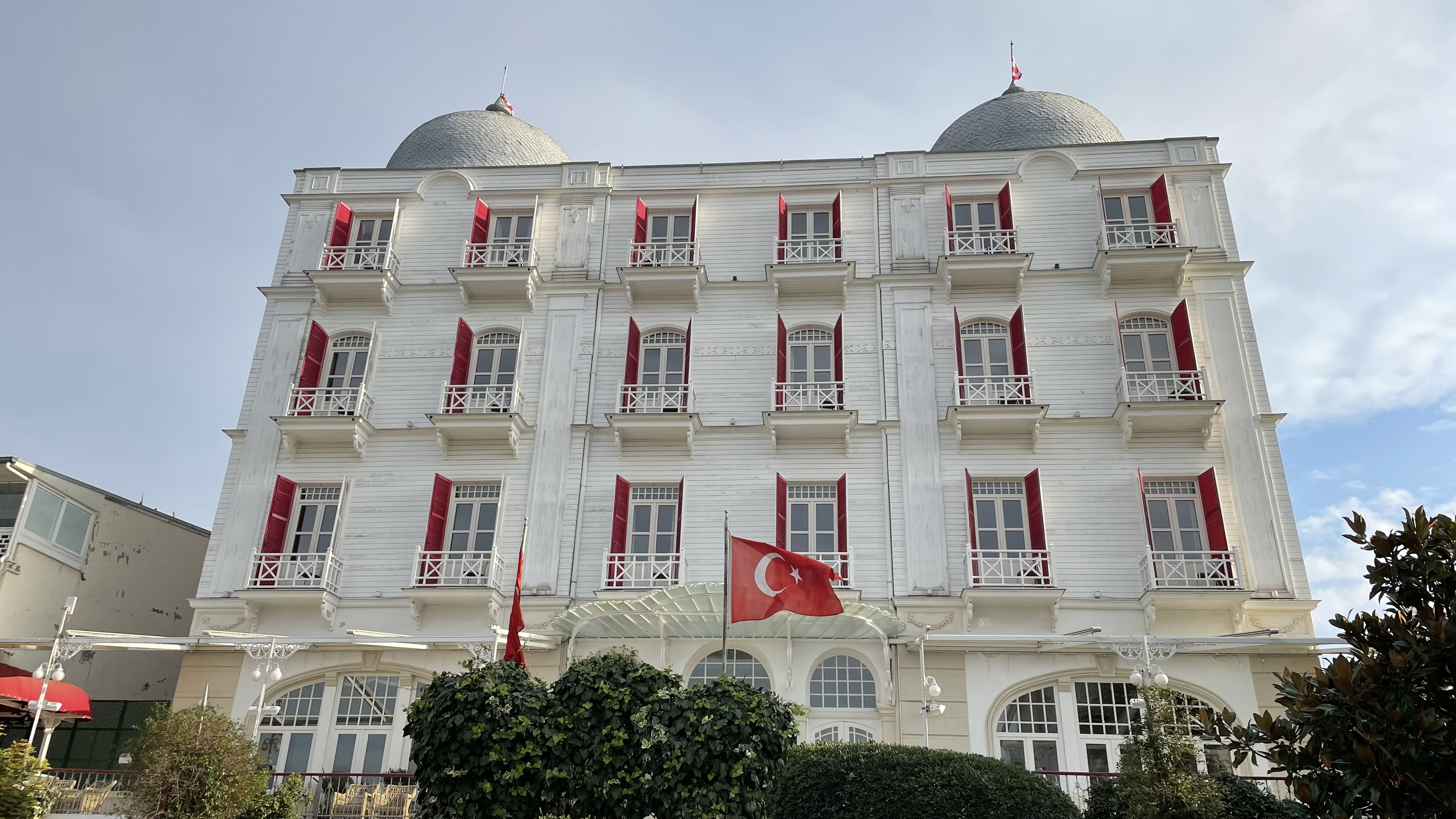
Splendid Palace Hotel

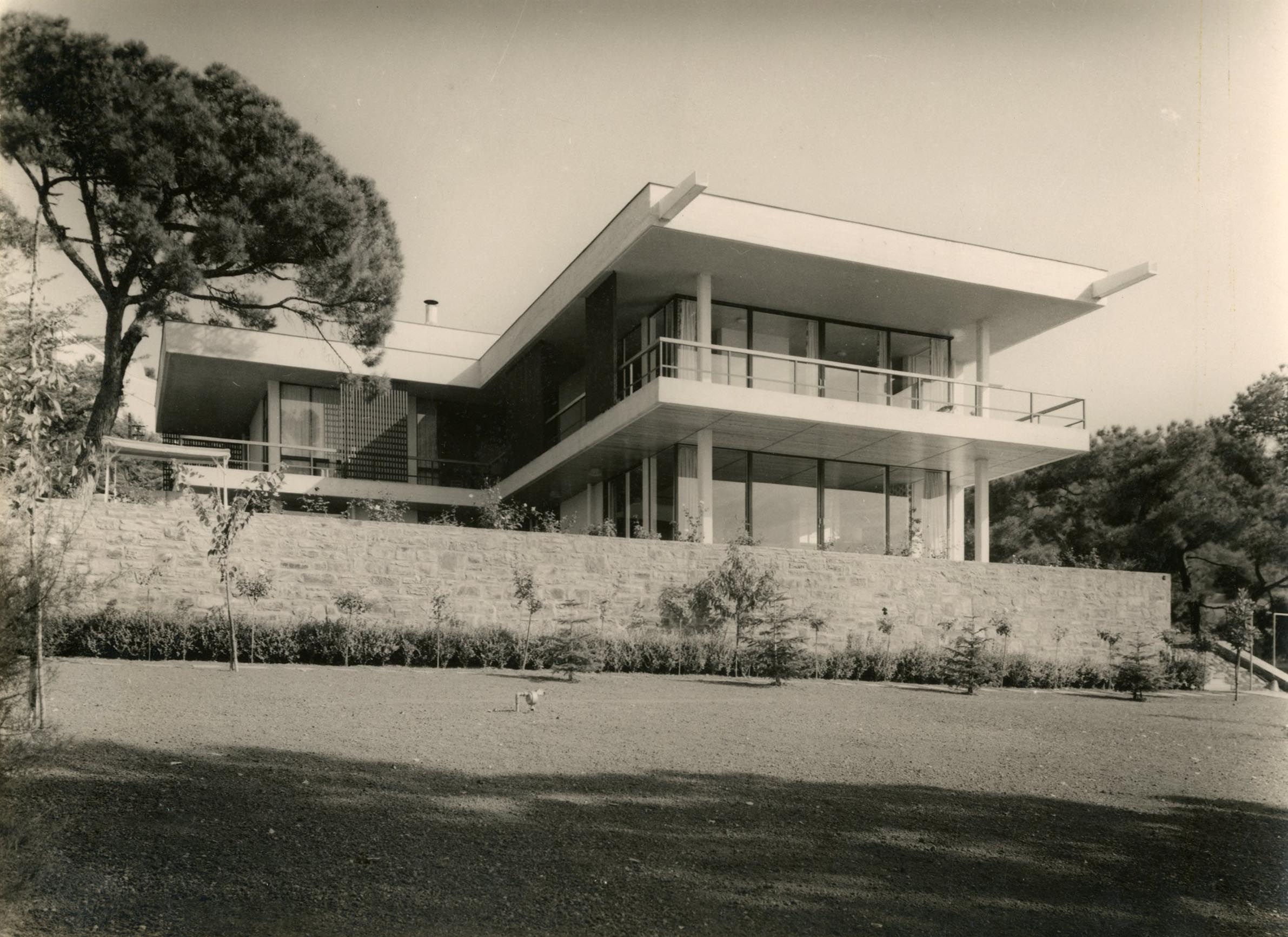
Rıza Derviş House

The isles of the Princes; or, The pleasures of Prinkipo by Samuel S. Cox
