= Ali Pasha ibn Abd Allah =

Sharif of the Awn clan

‘Alī Pāshā ibn ‘Abd Allāh ibn Muḥammad (Ottoman Turkish: علی پاشا بن عبد الله بن محمد; Arabic: علي باشا, ‘Alī Bāshā; 1859–1941) was a sharif of the Awn clan who served as Emir and Grand Sharif of Mecca from 1905 until he was deposed in the Young Turk Revolution of 1908.

He and his cousin Sharif Husayn ibn Ali were given the rank of pasha after the death of his father Sharif Abd Allah Pasha in 1877.

He assisted his uncle Sharif Awn ar-Rafiq who served as Emir from 1882 to 1905. When Awn ar-Rafiq died in July 1905, Ahmed Ratib Pasha, the Vali of Hejaz, appointed Sharif Ali as acting Emir until a decision could be reached in Istanbul. Three sharifs residing in Istanbul submitted their names to the Sultan as candidates: Sharif Husayn, Sharif Abd al-Ilah, and Sharif Ali Haydar of the rival House of Zayd. Abd al-Ilah, the younger brother of Awn ar-Rafiq, was the eldest of the House of Awn, but Sultan Abdul Hamid instead confirmed Sharif Ali as Emir and raised him to the rank of vizier and mushir. The telegraph confirming Ali's appointment arrived in mid-October, while the written irade (decree) is dated 2 Ramadan 1323 AH (c. 31 October 1905). However his formal investiture as Emir did not occur until April 1908.

In July 1908 the Young Turk Revolution reinstated the Ottoman constitution of 1876. In the Hejaz Sharif Ali and Ahmed Ratib Pasha opposed the new regime and delayed declaration of the constitution. Ali ordered the flogging of some men in Ta'if who were found discussing the subject. Ahmed Ratib was dismissed from his post on 7 August and ordered to Jeddah, where he was arrested by military officers of the Committee of Union and Progress and his property was confiscated. Ali was left as acting Vali, and was forced to announce his support for the constitution when he was taken by the local CUP officers to the barracks in Ta'if. In addition to making him swear on the Qur'an to follow the constitutional laws, the committee humiliated him by making him publicly declare his legal equality with a slave, a soldier, and a bedouin. He served as acting Wāli until late September when the new appointee, Kazim Pasha, arrived.

After the arrival of Kazim, Sharif Ali remained in Ta'if, refusing the Vali's request to come to Mecca. Due to his stubbornness and his questionable acceptance of the constitutional order, Kazim recommended that Ali be removed from office. He was dismissed in October 1908, and was instructed to leave the Hejaz soon so as to avoid attacks on his person similar to those received by Ahmed Ratib. However he repeatedly delayed his departure, and in April 1909 Sharif Husayn insisted on the removal of the former Emir. Ali left Mecca and settled under British rule in Cairo, where he lived until his death in 1941.

‘Alī ibn ‘Abd Allāh ibn Muḥammad ibn ‘Abd al-Mu‘īn ibn ‘Awn House of ‘Awn Cadet branch of the House of Qatādah Born: 1859 Died: 1941
Political offices
Preceded by Awn ar-Rafiq Pasha	Emir and Grand Sharif of Mecca; September 1905 – October 1908	Succeeded by Abd al-Ilah Pasha
