= List of rebellions in the Ottoman Empire =

Rebellions in the Ottoman Empire

During the 623-year existence of the Ottoman Empire, there were rebellions. Some of these rebellions were in fact interregnum (such as Cem’s rebellion). Some were national uprisings (such as Greek War of Independence). In the list below only those rebellions confined to Turkey, the heartland of Ottoman Empire are shown

== List ==
Note: Most of the rebellions are here named after their leader.

Name of rebellion	Place	Year
Sheikh Bedrettin	Karaburun, Aegean Region	1416
Şahkulu	Antalya, Mediterranean Region	1511
Celali	Anatolia	1519
Baba Zünnun Rebellion	Bozok	1526
Kalender Çelebi rebellion	Eastern Anatolia	1527
Beylerbeyi	Konstantiniyye	1589
Celali	Anatolia	1598–1602
Celali	Anatolia	1603–1610
Abaza	Eastern Anatolia - Central Anatolia	1622–1628
Atmeydanı	Konstantiniyye	1648
Çınar Incident	Konstantiniyye	1656
Abaza Hasan Revolt	Konstantiniyye	1658–1659
Edirne Event	Konstantiniyye-Edirne	1703
Patrona Halil	Konstantiniyye	1730
Kabakçı Mustafa	Konstantiniyye	1807–1808
Atçalı Kel Mehmet	Aydın, Aegean Region	1829–1830
Hejaz rebellion	Hejaz	1854–1856
Bitlis uprising	Bitlis	1907
31 March	Konstantiniyye	1909
Savior Officers	Konstantiniyye	1912
Babıali raid	Konstantiniyye	1913
Bitlis uprising	Bitlis	1914
