= Muhibb al-Din al-Khatib =

Syrian Islamic scholar of Salafism (1886–1969)

- محب الدين الخطيب
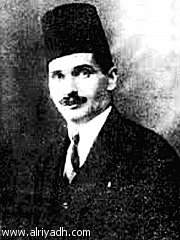
- Muhibb al-Din al-Khatib in 1930s
- Born: July 9, 1886; Damascus, Ottoman Syria
- Died: December 30, 1969 (aged 83); Cairo, United Arab Republic (modern Egypt)
- Known for: Founder of Al-Salafiyya Press and Bookstore in Cairo; key figure in early 20th-century Arab nationalist movements (Al-Fatat); co-founder of the Young Men's Muslim Association (YMMA)
- Movement: Salafi, Arab nationalism

Academic work
- Era: Modern era
- Main interests: Islamic studies, Arab nationalism, Journalism, publishing, Salafi thought
- Notable works: Al-Khutut al-Ariadah (الخطوط العريضة); Al-Zahra magazine (مجلة الزهراء); Al-Fath journal (جريدة الفتح)

Muhibb al-Din al-Khatib (Arabic: محب الدين الخطيب, romanized: Muḥibb al-Dīn al-Khaṭīb; 1886 – 30 December 1969) was a Syrian Islamic scholar of Salafism. He was the maternal uncle of Ali al-Tantawi and was the author of the pamphlet entitled al-Khutut al-Arida (The Broad Outline of the Foundations upon Which the Religion of the Imami Twelver Shiites is Based). He has been described as "one of the most influential anti-Shiite polemicists of the twentieth century".

In 1916, he was made the editor of Al Qibla, the official newspaper of Sharif Hussein.

== Early life and education ==
Born in Damascus in July 1886 al-Khatib was the son of a Damascene cleric called Abu al-Fath al-Khatib. Al Khatib received secondary education in his hometown and attended Maktab Anbar, a very well-known educational institute, where he studied modern sciences, Ottoman Turkish, French and some Persian. During his studies in Damascus he became one of the pupils of Salafi scholar Tahir al-Jazairi. Al Khatib continued his education at a state school in Beirut. In 1905 he went to Istanbul to study law and literature and also, founded the Society of Arab Awakening with Aref Al Shihabi there.

== Career and activities ==
In 1907 al-Khatib moved to Yemen where he served as a translator for the British consulate and became a member of Rashid Rida's Ottoman Council Society based in Cairo. Al-Khatib returned to Istanbul in 1909 and established a literary society. He was named the assistant general secretary of the Decentralization Party which was founded in Syria in 1913. Next year while he was going to Najd and Iraq he was arrested by the British and deported to Basra where he was jailed until July 1916. Following his release he first went to Egypt and then to Mecca where he met Sharif Hussain and cofounded a newspaper entitled Al Qibla in 1916 which he edited until 1920. In November 1917 al-Khatib launched another weekly newspaper, Al Irtiqa. In 1919 he moved to Damascus where he participated in the Young Arabs Society and became a member of its central committee. The same year he also served as the editor-in-chief of the official newspaper Al Asima.

Al-Khatib settled in Cairo in 1921 as result of his clash with Faisal, King of Syria and Iraq. He was appointed editor-in-chief of Al Ahram and served in the post for five years. He and another Syrian émigré Abdul Fattah Qattan established a publishing company, Salafi Publishing House, and a bookstore with the same name in Cairo. Al-Khatib launched Al Zahra and Al Fath magazines. In 1928 he assumed an editorial role for another magazine, Al Minhaj, which was banned by the government in 1930.

Khatib also published a book, Al Khuttut al-’Arida li al Shi‘a al Ithna ‘Ashiriyya (Arabic: Broad Outline of the Twelver Shiites).

== Views and death ==
Al Khatib was an Arab nationalist and was part of Arabist-Salafi circles in Cairo. He died in Cairo in December 1969.

== See also ==
- Criticism of Twelver Shi'ism
- Shi'a–Sunni relations

== Bibliography ==
- Rizvi, Sayyid Muhammad (1991). Muhibb al-Din al-Khatib: A Portrait of a Salafi-Arabist (1886-1969) (PDF) (MA). National Library of Canada.
