= Hejaz rebellion =

- Part of Rebellions in the Ottoman Empire
Date	1854–1856
Location	Hejaz, Ottoman Empire
Result	Ottoman victory
Territorial changes	Ottoman control temporarily challenged; full control restored by 1869

Belligerents
Ottoman Empire	Rebels led by Abdulmuttalib Efendi

Commanders and leaders
Kamil Pasha	Abd al-Muttalib ibn Ghalib (POW)

Strength
Unknown	600–2,000 (urban forces)

Casualties and losses
Unknown	Unknown

The Hejaz rebellion took place in the then Ottoman Province of Hejaz between 1854 and 1856. It was a reaction toward Ottoman rule in the Arabian Peninsula. It was triggered by an anti-slavery edict that contradicted religious law, but also a political conflict between Ottoman rule and the local sharifs of Mecca. It ultimately ended with Ottoman victory.

== Background ==
The Firman of 1854 was one of the causes of the Hejaz rebellion of 1855–1856. In 1854, the Ottoman Empire banned the trade in white women after pressure from Great Britain and France. The Ottoman Arabian Province of Hijaz was in a situation of strong tension in 1854. In June that year had tensions had erupted in fighting before it was nominally suppressed in the end of 1854.

Abdulmuttalib Efendi, emir of Mecca, was in a conflict with the Ottoman Governor of Jeddah, Kamil Pasha. Abdulmuttalib gathered support by asking the notables of Jeddah to write a letter of 1 April 1855 to the sharif and ulema of Mecca, where they condemned the Firman as concession to Europeans, since it authorized the Ottoman governors to ban slave trade, permitted non-Muslims to erect edifices in the Arab Peninsula, allow non-Muslim men to marry Muslim women and prohibited the interference in women's dress, and the notables of Jeddah petitioned the emir to petition the Sultan.

== Events ==
In August 1855 the Sultan ordered the deposition of Abdulmuttalib Efendi if necessary. Governor Kamil Pasha ordered the public reading of the firman in the province, resulting in the ulema of condemning it as contrary to sharia. However, open rebellion broke out with rioting in Mecca and Jeddah and attacks on houses belonging to French and British protegees. On 15 November 1855 Abdulmuttalib Efendi was deposed and replaced by sharif Muhammed ibn Avn. Abdulmuttalib Efendi refused to accept the deposition and gathered support among the desert Arab Bedouin chiefs, resulting in an urban army of 600-700 soldiers attacking the Ottoman troops in Bahre, and then again with a force of 2,000 soldiers; both times without success, but with riots in Mecca and Jeddah.

On 11 January 1856 Seyhülislam Arif Efendi ruled that the firman did not violate sharia to the dignitaries of Mecca, and that while it did prohibit the slave trade it did not prohibit slavery itself and did not threaten the slaveowners possession of their human property.

== End and aftermath ==
The rebellion was ended by the capture of Abdulmuttalib Efendi in 1856. When the Firman of 1857 against trade in African slaves was introduced, Hijaz was again disturbed by violent opposition, which caused the Hijaz Province to be excluded from obeying the law. However the tensions continued and resulted in the Jeddah massacre of 1858. Ottoman rule was not fully restored in the province until 1869.
