= Awn ar-Rafiq =

Sharif and Emir of Mecca

Awn al-Rafiq Pasha
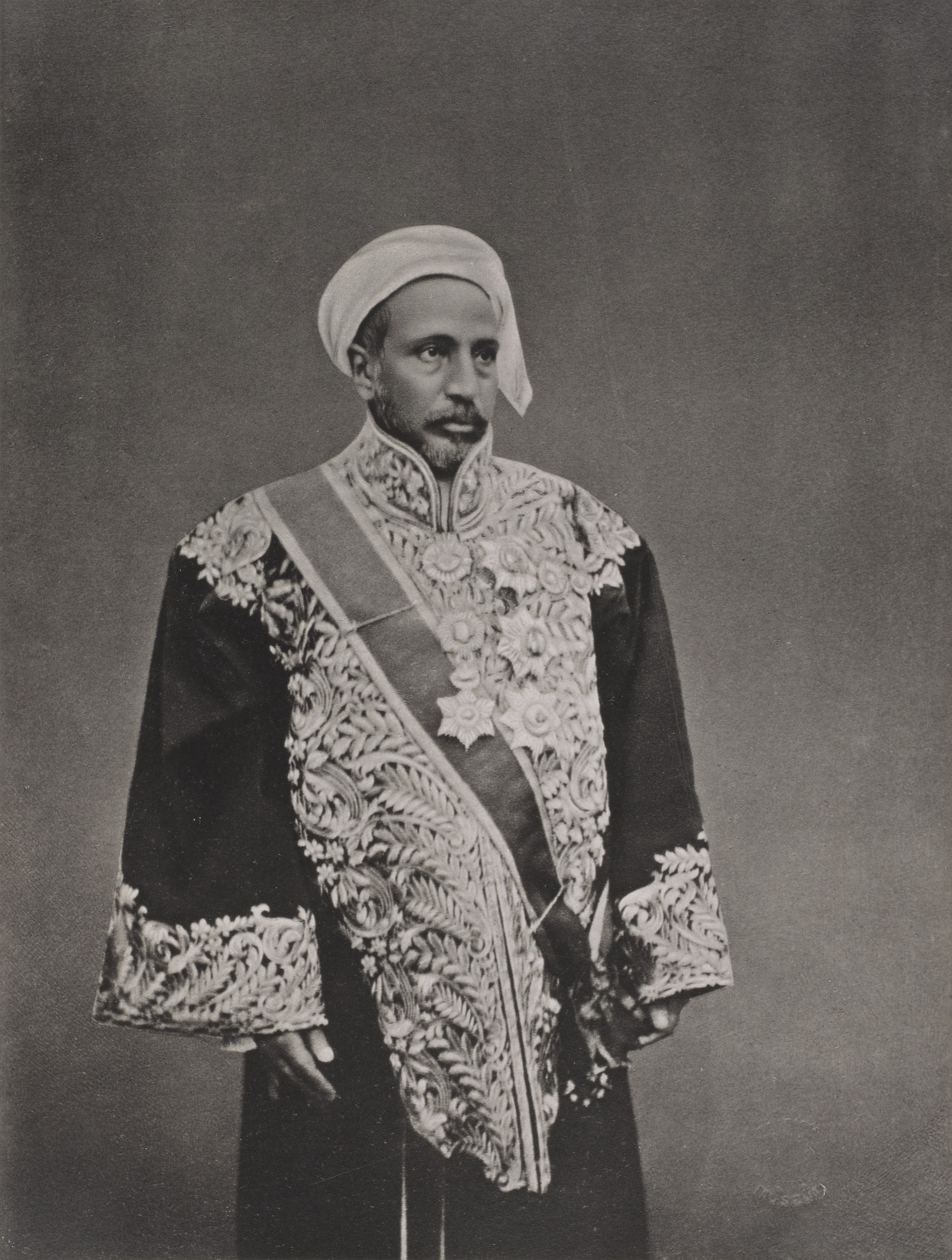
- Awn al-Rafiq in 1885

Sharif and Emir of Mecca
- Reign: October 1882 – 17 July 1905
- Predecessor: Abd al-Muttalib ibn Ghalib
- Successor: Ali Pasha ibn Abd Allah
- Born: February 1841; Medina, Ottoman Empire
- Died: 17 July 1905 (aged 64); Ta'if, Ottoman Empire
- Spouse: Fatima bint Jari
- Issue: Muhammad Abd al-Aziz
- House: Banu Qatadah; Abadilah; Dhawu Awn
- Father: Muhammad ibn Abd al-Mu'in

‘Awn al-Rafīq Pāshā ibn Muḥammad ibn ‘Abd al-Mu‘īn ibn Awn (Ottoman Turkish: عون الرفيق پاشا بن محمد بن عبد المعين بن عون; Arabic: عون الرفيق باشا, ‘Awn al-Rafīq Bāshā; February 1841 – 17 July 1905), also known as Awn al-Rafiq ibn Muhammad ibn Awn, was a member of the Awn clan of sharifs who served as Emir and Sharif of Mecca from 1882 to 1905.

== Birth ==
He was born in Medina at the end of Dhu al-Hijjah 1256 AH (February 1841), the fourth son of Sharif Muhammad ibn Abd al-Mu'in ibn Awn after Abdullah, Ali, and Husayn.

== Emirate ==
In June 1877, the Ottoman vali Taqiuddin Pasha appointed Awn al-Rafiq as acting Emir following the death of his eldest brother, Sharif Abd Allah Pasha, who had served as Emir for nearly two decades. Sharif Husayn Pasha, the next eldest of the Awn clan, was appointed to the Emirate and arrived from Istanbul in August. As was customary, the heir-apparent Awn al-Rafiq was then himself summoned to the capital, where he was appointed to the Ottoman Council of State with the rank of vizier. Husayn's tenure as Emir was cut short by his assassination in 1880. Sultan Abdulhamid, who suspected that the late Emir had been conspiring with the British to establish "an Arab government in opposition to the Caliphate", decided not to appoint Husayn's brother, Awn al-Rafiq to the Emirate. He instead appointed the elderly Sharif Abd al-Muttalib ibn Ghalib of the Dhawu Zayd, who had been held in Istanbul for the past two decades following his deposition in 1856. With this transfer of power to the rival clan of Zayd, the Sultan aimed to limit foreign influence and the power of the Awn clan, and to strengthen Ottoman control over the Hejaz. British diplomats attempted to block the appointment of Abd al-Muttalib. Immediately after Husayn's death, James Zohrab, the British consul in Jeddah, wrote to his superiors that British interests demanded the appointment of Awn al-Rafiq, who was "liberal and enlightened", while Abd al-Muttalib was "a fanatical Wahhabee" with a "hatred of Christians and foreigners". The British ambassador to Istanbul, Austen Henry Layard, asked the Sultan not to appoint Abd al-Muttalib, but was told that the decision had already been made. The Sultan did however assure Layard, as well Awn al-Rafiq, that he would be appointed following the death of Abd al-Muttalib.

In 1882 Abd al-Muttalib was deposed by Osman Nuri Pasha, who unilaterally declared Awn al-Rafiq's younger brother Sharif Abd al-Ilah as Emir. However this was rejected by Sultan Abd al-Hamid, who instead appointed Awn al-Rafiq as Emir, with Abd al-Ilah to serve as acting Emir until his arrival from Istanbul. A telegraph was sent to this effect at the end of Dhi al-Qi'dah 1299 AH (October 1882).

Awn al-Rafiq served as Emir until his death in Taif on 17 July 1905. He was buried near his brother Abd Allah in the qubbah (tomb-building) of Abd Allah ibn Abbas.

== Notes ==
‘Awn ar-Rafīq ibn Muḥammad ibn ‘Abd al-Mu‘īn ibn ‘Awn House of ‘Awn Cadet branch of the House of Qatādah Born: February 1841 Died: 17 July 1905
Political offices
Preceded by Abd al-Ilah Pasha	Emir and Sharif of Mecca; 8 October 1882 – 17 July 1905	Succeeded by Ali Pasha ibn Abd Allah
