= Kalender Çelebi rebellion =

Ottoman reign of Suleiman

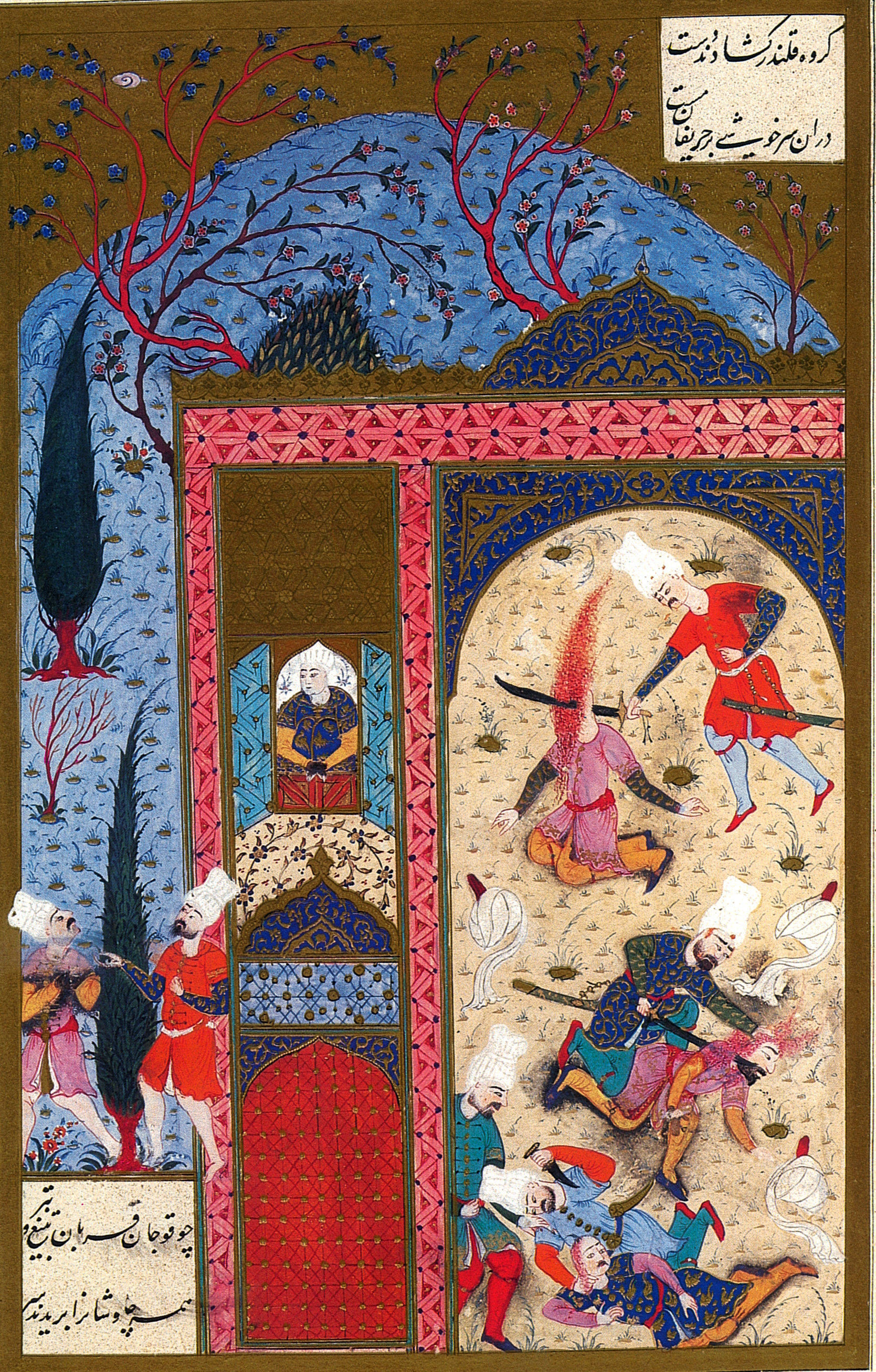
- Kalender Celebi Rebellion by Matrakçı Nasuh, Süleymanname, 16th century.
Date	1527
Location	Elbistan, Eastern Anatolia (present-day Turkey)
Result	Rebellion suppressed

Belligerents
Ottoman Empire	Kalender Çelebi movement

Commanders and leaders
(Ottoman Empire) Pargalı Ibrahim Pasha	Kalender Çelebi †

Strength
3,000 Janissaries; 2,000 Sipahi	30,000

The Kalender Çelebi rebellion was a rebellion that occurred in 1527 in Elbistan, Eastern Anatolia (present-day Turkey). This rebellion was led by Kalender Çelebi against the Ottoman reign of Suleiman the Magnificent, who was extending his influence in the region. Although Kalender Çelebi gained the initial support of local tribal chieftains he was outmanoeuvred by Suleiman. Ultimately, the Ottoman Empire defeated the rebels, and killed Çelebi.

== Beginnings ==
Entitled as a Şah, Kalender Çelebi was an Alevi leader in the region Maraş in Turkey. He was also a sheikh of the Bektaşi Tariqa. It is alleged that he was a descendant of Hacı Bektaş-ı Veli. He had the support of the Safavids, Turkmen tribes who were influenced by the Safavi propaganda and were dissatisfied by economic decay and new reformations supported by Kalender Çelebi.

The rebellion began with the Battle of Mohács, with the support of the Turkmen tribes, Çiçekli, Akça Koyunlu, Masadlı, Bozoklua, and splintered groups who remained after the Baba Zünnun rebellion. With the support of Sunni Dulkadirli lords, the resistance grew in southeast Anatolia and to central Anatolia with the help of the sipahi's (Ottoman cavalry corps). According to different sources, around 30,000 men gathered around Kalender Çelebi. The news of the rebellion reached Kanuni Sultan Süleyman in Petrovaradin when he was returning from the Battle of Mohács.

Anatolian lords, including Behram Paşa and Mahmud Paşa, were sent to crush the rebellion. Before their arrival, Kalender Çelebi had already defeated Yakup Paşa in Sivas. In Diyarbakir, Kalender Çelebi had to retreat but later defeated Behram Paşa in Karaçayır. Additional lords from Aleppo and Karaman joined Behram Paşa, and on 8 June 1527, in Tokat Cincife, they lost to Çelebi. During this battle, lords of Karaman, Alâiye, Amasya and Birecik lost their lives.

== Defeat ==
After the growth of the rebellion, Sultan Suleiman appointed Sadrazam Pargalı Ibrahim Pasha to crush the uprising with 3000 Janissaries and 2000 sipahi. When Çelebi realized he could not win, he considered fleeing to Iran, but ultimately chose Baghdad.

Ibrahim gave many Turkmen tribes their rights and lands back, leading some Turkmen tribes to switch sides and join him. Çelebi had only 3000 to 4000 men left. Knowing this, Ibrahim attacked. Ottoman sources maintain that he died in battle, but Bektași tradition states that he was killed next to a mulberry tree in front of the tomb of his grandfather Bahm Sultan.

== Aftermath ==
The Kalender Celebi rebellion was one of the largest rebellions propelled by religious motives. The rebellion was brought to an end with the death of its leaders. The end of the rebellion was followed by massacres and suppression of the Alevi-Bektashi people.
