= Akhbar Umar =

Biography of a Rashidun caliph

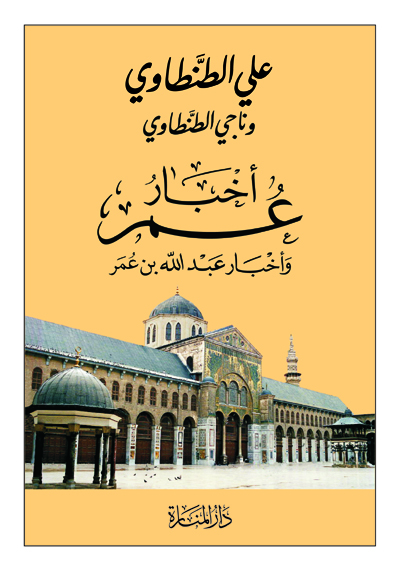
- Cover of the 1996 reprint which was published by Dar Al-Manarah
- Author: Ali Al-Tantawi
- Language: Arabic
- Genre: History, biography, Islamic literature
- Publisher: Dar Ibn Hazm (1959); Dar al-Manarah (1996)
- Publication place: Lebanon (original, 1959); Saudi Arabia (1996 reprint)

Akhbar Umar, fully known as Akhbar ʽUmar wa-Akhbar ʽAbd Allah ibn ʽUmar (Arabic: أخبار عُمر وَأَخْبار عبد الله بن عُمر) is a biography of the Rashidun caliph Umar ibn al-Khattab and his son, Abdullah ibn Umar. The book is written by Ali Al-Tantawi, an award-winning Syrian Islamic scholar and historian, while an appendix at the back is written by his brother, Naji Al-Tantawi.

== About the author ==
Mohammad Ali Al-Tantawi was an Islamic scholar, historian and professor. He was awarded the King Faisal Prize in 1990 for his efforts in Islamic scholarship and research. Al-Tantawi later moved to Saudi Arabia where he lived the rest of his life until he eventually died in 1999, and was buried in Jeddah.

== Publication history ==
Akhbar Umar was published in Beirut in 1959 by the Lebanese printing house Dar Ibn Hazm. It was reprinted in 1996 and republished by Dar al-Manarah, a publishing house based in Jeddah.

== Content ==
Akhbar Umar details the life of Umar ibn al-Khattab, including his conversion to Islam. The book's chapters describe his many exploits as a companion of Muhammad, as well as the battles he commanded and/or took part in. The final chapter is about his assassination in Medina, followed by an appendix written by Naji Al-Tantawi, the author's brother, regarding information about Umar's son Abdullah ibn Umar.

== See also ==
- List of Sunni books
