= Al Qibla =

Official newspaper of the Kingdom of Hejaz (1916–1924)

- Type: Official newspaper
- Format: Broadsheet
- Founders: Muḥibb ad-Dīn al-Khaṭīb; Fuad Al Khatib
- Publisher: Wilāya Press
- Editor-in-chief: Muḥibb al-Dīn al-Khaṭīb; Tayeb Al Sassi; Sharīf al-Ḥusayn (from 1919)
- Founded: 1916
- Ceased publication: September 1924
- Language: Arabic
- Headquarters: Mecca
- Country: Kingdom of Hejaz

Al Qibla (Arabic: ٱلْقِبْلَة, romanized: al-Qiblah, lit. 'Direction of Mecca') was the official gazette of the Kingdom of Hejaz. The paper was backed by the British. It was in circulation between 1916 and 1924 and headquartered in Mecca. The paper was a four-page broadsheet and published twice a week, on Mondays and on Thursdays.

The slogan of Al Qibla was the following verse taken from Quran:

And We did not make the qibla which you used to face except that We might make evident who would follow the Messenger from those who would turn on their heels.

== History ==
Al Qibla was first published on 15 August 1916, five weeks after the capture of Mecca by Sharif Hussein. The founders of the paper were Muhib Al Din Al Khatib and Fuad Al Khatib. They were tasked by the British to start the paper to address the whole Arabic-reading public. It was published by Wilāya Press in Mecca on a semi-weekly basis. Muhib Al Din Al Khatib was also its founding editor-in-chief. Tayeb Al Sassi also served in the post.

Shortly after its founding, Sharif Hussein became the King of Hejaz, and the coronation ceremony held in October 1916 was fully covered in Al Qibla. The paper featured international news based on the official communiques from Cairo, local news and writings of leading Arabic writers concerning ethical and social virtues. It also published reports from European and other foreign newspapers and periodicals. The British agents in the region helped the distribution of the paper.

Following capture of Hejaz by Abdulaziz bin Abdul Rahman Al Saud, founder and later king of Saudi Arabia, Al Qibla was replaced by Umm al Qura. Al Qibla ceased publication following its final issue in September 1924. It produced a total of 852 issues over the course of its publication.

== Contributors and political stance ==
Sharif Hussein contributed to the design of the paper and the language used in the news. He also published several articles in the paper which was supported by the British authorities. In 1919, he began to receive credit as editor-in-chief of the paper in the masthead. The contributors of Al Qibla were mostly Syrian exiles living in Egypt.

Al Qibla had an Arabist and Islamist ideology. The goal of the paper was to strengthen the awareness of the Arabs and Muslims about the threats of Wahhabism against Islam. Al Qibla also opposed to the Committee of Union and Progress and the military alliance of the Ottoman Empire with the Central Powers in World War I. In addition, Sharif Hussein employed the publication to justify his revolt against the Ottoman Empire. The paper's interest in the Ottoman Empire continued with the publication many articles criticizing the developments in the country. It also published an article in which it was argued that the Caliphate should belong to the Arabs when the last Ottoman sultan Mehmed VI expressed his intent to assume the role.

Following the publication of the Balfour Declaration in November 1917, Sharif Hussein published a number of articles in Al Qibla in which he called for the cooperation with Jews and asked Arabs to avoid conflicts with the British in that they would help them achieve independence. The paper frequently praised the rule of Sharif Hussein whom it compared to Muhammad Ali Pasha, ruler of Egypt between 1805 and 1848.

== Legacy ==
In the anniversary of the foundation of the Hashemite Kingdom of Hejaz, several issues of Al Qibla were reprinted and distributed as a supplement of the Jordanian daily newspapers, including The Jordan Times, in 2016.
