= Ali Haidar Pasha =

Ottoman politician (1866–1935)

ʿAlī Ḥaydar Pāshā ibn Jābir (Note: When diacritics are undesired, his name may be written Ali Haidar Pasha.) (Ottoman Turkish: علی حیدر پاشا بن جابر; Arabic: علي حيدر باشا, ʿAlī Ḥaydar Bāshā; April 1866 – 12 May 1935) was an Ottoman politician who served as Emir and Grand Sharif of Mecca from 1916 to 1917 during the Arab Revolt and the First World War.

== Life in Istanbul to 1914 ==
ʿAlī Ḥaydar, the son of Sharif ʿAlī Jābir Pāshā, was born in April 1866 in a yalı belonging to his grandfather, Sharif ‘Abd al-Muttalib, formerly Emir of Mecca, in the Kanlıca neighborhood of Istanbul (Constantinople). He was an Arab, a member of the Dhawu Zayd, a clan of the Banu Qatada tribe. In 1879 ‘Abd al-Muttalib was appointed Emir of Mecca for the third time and ʿAlī Ḥaydar was sent as a hostage to Istanbul, where he eventually settled in the Çamlıca Hill district. In 1887 he was made a member of the Council of State with the rank of bala.

ʿAlī Ḥaydar's first wife was Sabiha Hanım, a Turkish woman. With her he had one daughter, Şerife Nimet Hanım, and three sons. Their eldest son was Sharif Damat Muhammed Abdülmecid Beyefendi, educated in Britain, who married the Ottoman princess Rukiye Sultan, a daughter of Şehzade Mehmed Selaheddin, son of Murad V. Their second son, Şerif Muhiddin Targan, became a musician and married Safiye Ayla. Their third son was Şerif Muhammed Emin Bey.

ʿAlī Ḥaydar's second wife was an Irishwoman, Isobel Duncan, who converted to Islam and took the name Fatima. They had two daughters, Şerife Süfeyme Hanım and Şerife Musbah Hanım, and one son, Şerif Faisal Bey. Ḥaydar was widely considered an anglophile before the war; he was also a pan-Islamist with close ties to Indian Muslims. In 1908, he was passed over for the Emirate and it was instead given to Ḥusayn ibn ʿAlī, who was older but belonged to the junior Dhawu Awn clan of the Banu Qatada. Ḥaydar, who was considered a liberal on good terms with the Committee of Union and Progress government, was infuriated.

In Istanbul, he served for many years as the naqib al-ashraf, representative of the Hejazi clans. He served as Minister of Waqfs (charitable endowments) from January 1910 in the cabinet of Grand Vizier Ibrahim Hakki Pasha, but he resigned after some time and was replaced by Mustafa Hayri Bey. He also sat for a time in the Imperial Senate. In 1911 the President of the Senate Mehmed Said Pasha was appointed Grand Vizier. Vice-President of the Senate Ahmed Muhtar Pasha was appointed President and ʿAlī Ḥaydar was appointed Vice-President. Most of his descendants live in Turkey and took the surname Targan after the Surname Law.

== Life in Medina during World War I ==
There were rumours upon the Ottoman entry into the world war (1914) that Ḥusayn ibn ʿAlī would be replaced by Ḥaydar, but nothing happened for two years. On 10 June 1916, Ḥusayn openly rebelled. Within days, the Grand Vizier Said Halim Pasha invited ʿAlī Ḥaydar by telegram to replace Ḥusayn and the Minister of the Interior, Talaat Pasha, visited him at his home to confirm the offer. According to his own account, Ḥaydar reminded Said Halim of their families' intertwined history: "The fall of my own family and the rise of the Aoun, (Note: The Aoun branch of the Banu Hashim.) to which Ḥusayn belongs, was entirely due to Mohammed Ali. (Note: Muhammad Ali Pasha was the first khedive of Egypt.) You are his grandson and I am the great-grandson of Sherif Ghalib whom he deposed. (Note: Ghalib Efendi was deposed in 1827.) Now God has given you the opportunity to rectify and redeem the crime of your grandfather." In June, Ḥaydar's agent in Jeddah, Ahmed el-Hezazi, was arrested and his house looted by orders of Ḥusayn.

On 2 July 1916, Ḥusayn was formally dismissed as emir of Mecca and on 16 July, Sultan Mehmed V issued an iradé appointing ʿAlī Ḥaydar in his place. On 19 July, ʿAlī Ḥaydar was seen off at the Haydarpaşa railway station by the entire cabinet and the future sultan Mehmed VI. Accompanied by a ceremonial guard of 300 infantry and 25 cavalry, he took a train to Damascus, where he was welcomed by Djemal Pasha. Djemal, who distrusted him, attached Nureddin Bey to his retinue with instructions to kill Ḥaydar if he tried to contact the British. On 29 July, Ḥaydar's party left Damascus; it arrived in Medina, which was being held by Fakhri Pasha against the rebels, on 1 August. On 9 August, Ḥaydar issued a proclamation in response to Ḥusayn's earlier publicly circulated letter:

The enemy has invaded Egypt, the Sudan and India, Yemen, Ahkaf, Oman and vicinity, and this time he made an attempt on Basra. [...] El Sherif Hessein leagues himself with that enemy, and is now trying to place the House of God, Islam's Qibla, and the tomb of the prophet, under the protection of a Christian Government, at war with the Turkish Government. and doing what it can to subjugate all Moslem nations [...]

The British translated it and published it in their intelligence bulletin, but its publication in India and Egypt was forbidden. Ḥaydar meanwhile secured the allegiance of the tribes around Medina by bribery.

After the Ottoman forces almost captured Mecca in August 1916, they settled down to a siege in Medina. In March 1917 the government ordered the troops withdrawn, but Fakhri Pasha convinced Ḥaydar to get the order revoked. Ḥaydar himself left Medina for Damascus that month. He continued to hold the title Emir of Mecca until the office was abolished by imperial decree in 1919.

== Sources ==
- Baker, Randall (1979). King Husain and the Kingdom of Hejaz. New York: Oleander Press.
- Hogarth, David George (1978) [1917]. Hejaz Before World War I: A Handbook (2nd ed.). New York: Oleander Press.
- Mohs, Polly A. (2008). Military Intelligence and the Arab Revolt: The First Modern Intelligence War. Oxford: Routledge.
- Stitt, George (1948). A Prince of Arabia: The Emir Shereef Ali Haider. London: George Allen & Unwin.
- Uzunçarşılı, İsmail Hakkı (2003) [1972]. Mekke-i mükerreme emirleri اشراف مكة المكرمة وامراؤها في العهد العثماني [Ashrāf Makkat al-Mukarramah wa-umarāʼuhā fī al-ʻahd al-ʻUthmānī] (in Turkish). Translated by Murād, Khalīl ʻAlī (1st ed.). Beirut: al-Dār al-ʻArabīyah lil-Mawsūʻāt.

ʻAlī Haydar ibn Jābir ibn ‘Abd al-Muttalib ibn Ghālib Dhawu Zayd; Branch of Banu Qatadah Born: 15 December 1866 Died: 12 May 1935
Political offices
Preceded by Ahmed Muhtar Pasha	Vice-President of the Senate; 1911–?	Succeeded by ?
Preceded by ?	Minister of Waqfs; 1910 – 1910/1911	Succeeded by Mustafa Hayri Bey
Preceded by Ḥusayn ibn ʿAlī	— TITULAR — Sharif and Emir of Mecca; 16 July 1916 – 1919; Reason for succession failure: Arab revolt	Office abolished
