= Umm Al-Qura (newspaper) =

Saudi Arabian official newspaper

- Type: Weekly newspaper
- Publisher: Ministry of Media
- Founded: 12 December 1924; 101 years ago
- Language: Arabic
- Headquarters: Mecca, Kingdom of Saudi Arabia
- Website: http://www.uqn.gov.sa/

Umm Al-Qura (Arabic: أُم القُرى, lit. 'The Mother of Villages') is the first Arabic-language Saudi Arabian daily newspaper based in Mecca, and the official gazette of the Kingdom of Saudi Arabia. The paper has been in circulation since 1924. Its editor-in-chief now is Ashraf Al-Husseini.

== History and profile ==
Umm Al-Qura is established by Ibn Saud, the Kingdom's founder, and the first issue was published on 12 December 1924. In fact, the paper was a successor of Al Qibla which was the official gazette of the Kingdom of Hejaz. One of the reasons behind the establishment of Umm Al-Qura was the harsh criticisms of an Egyptian newspaper, Al Muqattam, against Ibn Saud. Ibn Saud started the paper to counterweigh the propaganda of Al Muqattam through the paper.

Umm Al-Qura was initially a weekly newspaper issued in four hand-printed pages before it had turned into a government gazette – an announcer of royal decrees and other state-related news. Shortly after its start, Umm Al-Qura frequently featured articles supporting Wahhabi doctrine which was given as a branch of Sunni Islam. The paper called Ibn Saud the Caeser of the Arabs following the annexation of Hejaz.

The founding editor-in-chief of the paper was Yusuf Yasin, an advisor to Ibn Saud. Ghalib Hamza Abulfaraj, a Saudi businessman, also served as the editor-in-chief of the paper. One of its early contributors was St John Philby.

Umm Al-Qura is published by the Saudi Ministry of Culture and Information.

== Significant events covered by the paper ==
The significant events that the paper covered, sometimes in special issues, included:

- Unification of Hejaz and Nejd (1926)
- Establishment of the Kingdom of Saudi Arabia (1932)
- Discovery of oil in Saudi Arabia (1938)
- The historic meeting between King Abdulaziz and President Franklin D. Roosevelt of the United States (1945)
- First Arab-Israeli war (1948)
- Death of King Abdulaziz (1953)

== Financial crisis ==
During World War II all newspapers at that time, Sawt Al Hijaz, Al-Madina Al manawara, and Umm Al Qura experienced financial crises, leading to the suspension of their publication from 1941 to 1946 except Umm Al Qura which continued to be issued.
