= Abd al-Ilah Pasha =

Sharif of the Awn clan, and onetime Emir of Mecca

Sharif Abd al-Ilah Pasha
- الشريف عبد الإله باشا

Sharif and Emir of Mecca
- In office 24 October 1908 – 29 October 1908
- Preceded by: Ali Pasha ibn Abd Allah
- Succeeded by: Husayn Pasha ibn Ali
- In office September 1882 – October 1882
- Preceded by: Abd al-Muttalib ibn Ghalib
- Succeeded by: Awn ar-Rafiq Pasha

Personal details
- Born: 1845
- Died: 29 October 1908 (aged 62–63) Constantinople, Ottoman Empire
- Spouse: Malika Khanum
- Children: Sharif Salim Pasha; Sharifa Abdiya Khanum; Sharifa Nafissa Khanum
- Parent: Muhammad Ibn Awn (father)

Sharif Abd al-Ilah Pasha ibn Muhammad (Arabic: الشريف عبد الإله باشا بن محمد al-Sharīf ‘Abd al-Ilāh Bāshā ibn Muḥammad; Ottoman Turkish: شريف عبد الإله پاشا بن محمد Şerif Abdülilah Paşa bin Muhammed; 1845 – 27 October 1908) was a sharif of the Awn clan who was briefly proclaimed Sharif and Emir of Mecca in 1882. He was appointed again in 1908 but died before reaching Mecca.

== Biography ==
Sharif Abd al-Ilah was born in 1261 AH (1845), the youngest son of Sharif Muhammad Ibn Awn.

On 28 Shawwal 1299 AH (September 1882) Vali Osman Nuri Pasha deposed Sharif Abd al-Muttalib ibn Ghalib of the Zayd clan and unilaterally installed Abd al-Ilah as Emir. In late Dhi al-Qidah 1299 AH (October 1882) Sultan Abd al-Hamid overturned the appointment and instead appointed Abd al-Ilah's brother Awn al-Rafiq as Emir. Abd al-Ilah served as acting Emir until his brother's arrival in early Dhi al-Hijjah (October 1882). In 1883 he moved to Istanbul where on 24 Rabi al-Awwal (3 February 1883) he was awarded the rank of vezir and appointed to the Council of State.

After Awn al-Rafiq's death in 1905, Abd al-Ilah was rejected for the Emirate in favor of his nephew Sharif Ali ibn Abd Allah, who was actively support by Vali Ratib Pasha. After Ali was deposed, Abd al-Ilah was finally named Emir on 28 Ramadan 1326 (24 October 1908). However only a few days later he died in Istanbul, on 2 or 3 Shawwal 1326 AH (28 or 29 October 1908).

== Honours ==
National

- Rank of Vizir, 3 February 1883.
- Nişan-ı Osmani, 1st Class [Imperial Orders of the Osmans].
- Nişan-ı Mecidi, 1st Class [Imperial Order of Nobility].
- Atiq Nishan-i-Iftikhar [Imperial Order of Glory].
- Nishan-i-Ali-Imtiaz [Exalted Order of Distinction].
- Imtiyaz Medals in gold and silver.
- Liyakat Medals in gold and silver.
- Hijaz Medal in gold.

Foreign

- Order of the Lion and the Sun, 1st class of the Persian Empire.

== Residence ==
His seaside residence, the Şerifler Yalısı ("yalı of the Sharif") in the Emirgan neighborhood of Istanbul, has been converted into a museum.

== Notes ==
‘Abd al-Ilāh ibn Muḥammad ibn ‘Abd al-Mu‘īn ibn ‘Awn House of ‘Awn; Branch of the House of Qatādah Born: 1845 Died: 27 October 1908
Political offices
Preceded by Abd al-Muttalib ibn Ghalib	Sharif and Emir of Mecca; September 1882 – October 1882	Succeeded by Awn ar-Rafiq Pasha
Preceded by Ali Pasha ibn Abd Allah	Sharif and Emir of Mecca; 24 October 1908 – 27 October 1908	Succeeded by Husayn Pasha ibn Ali
