= Ali Al-Tantawi =

Syrian jurist, writer and teacher

- محمد علي الطنطاوي

Personal life
- Born: محمد علي مصطفى الطنطاوي; 12 June 1909 Damascus, (Ottoman Empire) Ottoman Syria
- Died: 18 June 1999 (aged 90) Jeddah, Saudi Arabia

Religious life
- Religion: Islam
- Movement: Salafiyya

Mohammad Ali Al-Tantawi was a Syrian Sunni Islamic jurist, writer, editor, broadcaster, teacher and judge considered one of the leading figures in Islamic preaching and Arab literature in the twentieth century.

Al-Tantawi was the recipient of the King Faisal Prize in 1990 for his services for Islam.

== Biography ==
Al-Tantawi was born in Damascus in 1909, into a family of religious scholars: his paternal grandfather, who moved from Egypt, was a graduate of al-Azhar who specialized in astronomy, his father was an Islamic scholar as well and so was his maternal uncle, Sheikh Muhibb ad-Deen al-Khatib.

Aftar attending the prestigious Maktab Anbar, al-Tantawi would then study Islamic law at the University of Damascus, and would militate against the French occupation of Syria and the Zionist project in Palestine, one of the first Islamic scholars putting his attention to this issue.

Al-Tantawi wrote in many Arab newspapers throughout the years, most importantly of which was Egyptian magazine Arrissalah from 1933 to 1953.

His daughter, Banan al-Tantawi was assassinated at her home in Aachen by a death squad sent by the Assad regime on 17 March 1981.

Being unable to resume his Islamic activism as he wished, he moved to Saudi Arabia in the late 1960s where he spent the last decades of his life. He died in 1999 and was buried in Jeddah.

== Books ==
- General Introduction to Islam, Dar al-Manarah, 2000 (third revised edition), 255 p.
- A Critical Introduction To Islam: Life Is A Journey, AlifBooks, 2025 (Amazon ebook edition)

https://www.amazon.com/dp/B0FT69P2DM

- Akhbar Umar, Dar Ibn Hazm, 1959, 488 p.
