= Hussein, King of Hejaz =

Ruler of Mecca from 1908 to 1924

Hussein bin Ali ٱلْحُسَيْن بِن عَلِي
- King of the Arabs; Sharifian Caliph; Custodian of the Two Holy Mosques
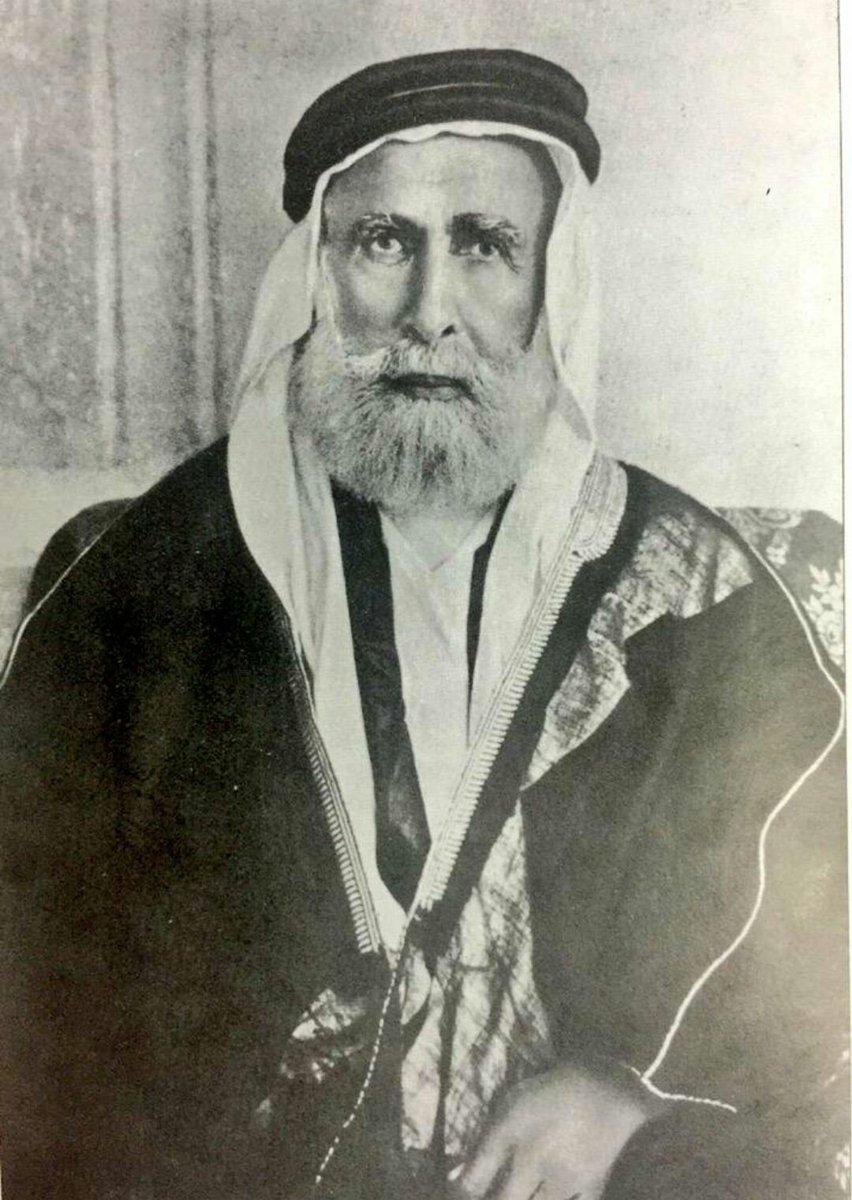
- King Hussein in 1916

King of Hejaz
- Reign: 10 June 1916 – 3 October 1924
- Predecessor: Office established
- Successor: Ali bin Hussein
- Prime Minister: Ali bin Hussein

Sharif and Emir of Mecca
- Reign: 1 November 1908 – 3 October 1924
- Predecessor: Abdallah bin Muhammad
- Successor: Ali bin Hussein

Sharifian Caliph
- Reign: 3 March 1924 – 4 June 1931 (in exile since 19 December 1925) (Note: The legitimacy of his Caliphate is disputed; however, the date of end can be assigned to his loss of the Haramayn, in 1925 or to his death, in 1931. Both interpretations can be found in sources.)
- Predecessor: Abdulmejid II
- Successor: Office abolished
- Born: 1 May 1853; Istanbul, Ottoman Empire
- Died: 4 June 1931 (aged 78); Amman, Transjordan
- Burial: al-Arghūniyya, the Noble Sanctuary, Jerusalem, British Palestine
- Spouse: Sharifa Abdiyah bint Abdullah; Madiha; Sharifa Khadija bint Abdullah; Adila Khanum
- Issue: Ali of Hejaz; Abdullah I of Jordan; Princess Fatima; Faisal I of Iraq; Princess Saliha; Princess Sara; Prince Zeid
- House: Banu Qatadah
- Dynasty: Hashemite dynasty
- Father: Ali bin Muhammad
- Mother: Salah Bani-Shahar
- Religion: Sunni Islam
- Military career
- Allegiance: Sharifate of Mecca (1908–1916); Kingdom of Hejaz (1916–1924)
- Branch: Sharifian Army
- Conflicts: Arab Revolt; Saudi conquest of Hejaz

Hussein bin Ali al-Hashimi (Arabic: ٱلْحُسَيْن بِن عَلِي ٱلْهَاشِمِي, romanized: al-Ḥusayn bin 'Alī al-Hāshimī; 1 May 1853 – 4 June 1931) was a Hejazi leader from the Banu Qatadah branch of the Banu Hashim clan who was the Sharif and Emir of Mecca from 1908 and, after proclaiming the Great Arab Revolt against the Ottoman Empire, King of the Hejaz, even if he refused this title, from 1916 to 1924. He accepted the Caliphate after delegations from the Hejaz and neighboring regions urged him to assume it, staying in power until 1925 when Hejaz was invaded by the Sultanate of Nejd. His Caliphate was opposed by the British and French empires, the Zionists and the Wahhabis alike. He received symbolic support from certain Hejazi religious circles and some Arab delegations, but broad Muslim recognition did not materialize. Later Arab nationalist writers sometimes portrayed him as the father of modern pan-Arabism, but some historians argue that the Hashemites were still newer converts to Arabism in 1916 and were not early Arab nationalists.

In 1908, in the aftermath of the Young Turk Revolution, Hussein was appointed Sharif of Mecca by the Ottoman sultan Abdul Hamid II. His relationship with the Ottoman government deteriorated after the Committee of Union and Progress took power, due to CUP efforts to centralize administration in the Hijaz and reduce the Sharif’s traditional autonomy. In 1916, with the promise of British support for Arab independence, although it is debated as to what extent the British were influential in his choice, he revolted against the Ottomans only after attempts to secure hereditary control of the Hijaz through negotiation with the Ottoman government failed, accusing the Committee of Union and Progress of violating tenets of Islam and limiting the power of the sultan-caliph, framing the revolt as a defense of the historic rights of the Hejaz rather than a modern nationalist movement. While his armies, led by his sons, were engaged in fighting the Ottoman and German troops in the Middle East, the initial stage of the insurrection was carried out entirely with Hejazi forces, and Arabs in Syria and Iraq never actually rose against the Turks. Hussein supported the Armenians during the Armenian genocide and saved up to 4,000 of them. In the aftermath of World War I, Hussein refused to ratify the Treaty of Versailles, in protest against the Balfour Declaration, a document supporting the Jewish settlers in Palestine, and the establishment of British and French mandates in Syria, Iraq, and Palestine. His sons Faisal and Abdullah were made rulers of Iraq and Transjordan respectively in 1921.

He later refused to sign the Anglo-Hashemite Treaty and thus was left in a very precarious position, as the British progressively decided to stop supporting him after the proclamation of his caliphate and the refusal to sign any treaty with them. Britain’s withdrawal of support left Hussein vulnerable to Ibn Saʻud’s expanding power, who promptly launched an invasion of the Kingdom of Hejaz. In October 1924, facing defeat by Ibn Saud, he abdicated and was succeeded as king by his eldest son Ali bin Hussein. After Hejaz was subsequently completely invaded by the Wahhabi armies of the Ikhwan, on 23 December 1925, Hussein surrendered to the Saudis, bringing the Kingdom of Hejaz, the Sharifate of Mecca and the Sharifian Caliphate to an end.

Hussein was forcibly removed from Aqaba by the British and deported to Cyprus in June 1925, where he lived under a form of supervised residence rather than formal imprisonment. His exile was motivated by British fears that his presence in Aqaba could provoke conflict with Ibn Saʿūd, not by immediate medical concerns. He was relocated from Cyprus to Amman in late 1930 after a significant decline in his health, and died there on 4 June 1931. He was buried at the Haram al-Sharif in Jerusalem, near al-Aqsa Mosque, with the ceremony supervised by British authorities.

== Biography ==
=== Ascendance and early life ===
==== Ascendance ====
Hussein bin Ali bin Muhammad bin Abd al-Mu'in bin Awn was born in Istanbul in 1853 or 1854. He was the eldest son of Sharif Ali bin Muhammad, who was the second son of Muhammad bin Abd al-Mu'in, the former Sharif of Mecca. As a member of the Hashemite dynasty, he was a descendant of Muhammad in the 37th generation through his grandson Hasan bin Ali. His mother, Salah Bani-Shahar, the wife of Ali, would have been a Circassian.

He belonged to the Dhawu Awn clan of the Abadilah, a branch of the Banu Qatadah tribe. The Banu Qatadah had ruled the Sharifate of Mecca since the accession of their ancestor Qatadah ibn Idris in 1201 and were the last of the four branches of Hashemite sharifs who, together, had governed Mecca since the 11th century.

==== Power struggles and birth ====
In 1827, Muhammad bin Abd al-Mu'in was appointed Sharif, the first Sharif of the Dhawu Awn branch and ending the Dhawu Zayd’s control of the amirate, which had lasted since 1718. He reigned until 1851, when he was replaced by Sharif Abd al-Muttalib ibn Ghalib of the Dhawu Zayd, the very same Sharif whom Muhammad ibn al-Abd al-Mu'in had succeeded. After his dismissal in 1851, Muhammad ibn Abd al-Mu‘in was arrested and exiled to Istanbul by Ottoman authorities. While there Hussein was born to Muhammad's son, Ali, in 1853–1854.

Muhammad was reinstated to power in 1856, and Hussein, then two or three years old, accompanied his father and grandfather to Mecca. Soon after, in 1858, Muhammad died and was succeeded by his eldest son, Emir and Sharif Abdullah Pasha, Hussein's uncle who held the Sharifate until 1877. While still young, he returned to Mecca after his father's death, when his uncle Sharif Abdullah called them back, with his mother in 1861–1862.

==== Youth and education ====
Hussein was raised at home, unlike other Hashemite youth who were typically sent outside the city to grow up among Bedouin nomads. Apparently a diligent young man, he mastered the principles of the Arabic language and was also educated in Islamic law and doctrine. Among his teachers was Sheikh Muhammad Mahmud at-Turkizi ash-Shinqiti, with whom he studied the seven Mu'allaqat. With Sheikh Ahmad Zayni Dahlan, he studied the Quran, completing its memorization before the age of 20.

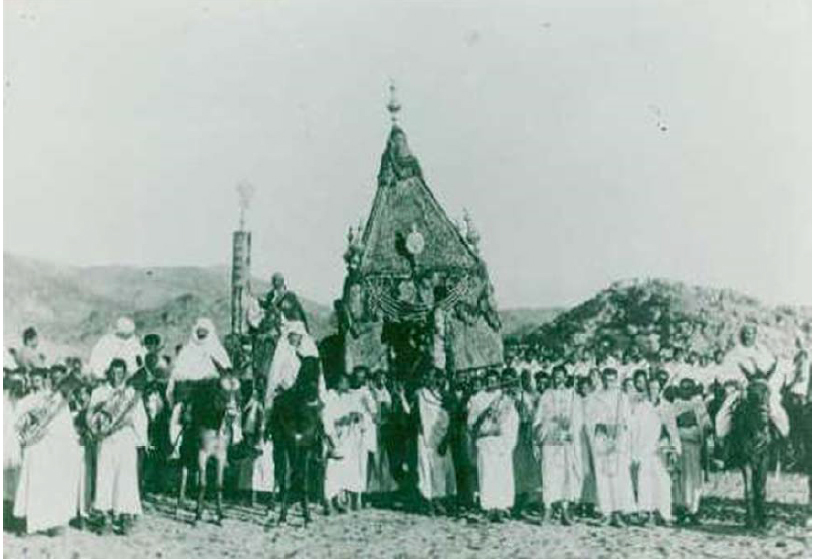
Mahmal of Hussein bin Ali probably in Hejaz, c. 1890

During Abdullah's reign, Hussein became familiar with the politics and intrigue surrounding the Sharifian court. He also participated in numerous expeditions to the Najd and the eastern regions of Hejaz to meet the Arab tribes, over whom the Sharifate of Mecca then exerted a loose form of control. He learned the customs of the Bedouins, including the skills necessary to withstand the harsh desert environment. During his travels, he also gained a thorough knowledge of the desert's flora and fauna and composed poems in humayni verse, a type of vernacular poetry (malhun) of the Bedouins. He also practiced horseback riding and hunting.

==== Exile to Istanbul ====
In 1875, he married Abdullah's daughter, Abdiyah, his cousin. In 1877, Abdullah died, and Hussein, along with his cousin Ali ibn Abdullah, received the rank of Pasha. After a series of political assassinations among his uncles vying for the position of Sharif, he gained attention for his independence of thought and was sent back to Istanbul by the reigning uncle at that time in 1892–1893. He remained there for 15 years, until 1908, mainly focusing on raising his children, learning the politics of the Sublime Porte—where he aligned with the conservative faction—and hoping to return home.

=== As Emir ===
==== Appointment ====
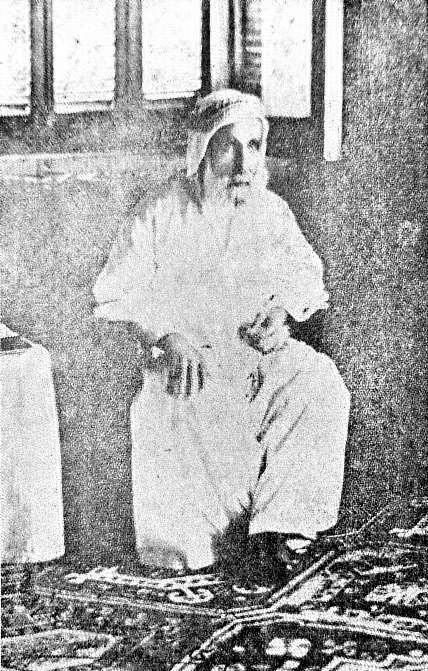
Hussein bin Ali (date unknown)

Following the removal of his predecessor in October and the sudden death of his successor shortly thereafter, Hussein was appointed grand sharif by official decree of the sultan Abdul Hamid II in November 1908. His appointment came during a time of cooperation between Arab Notables and the new regime in Istanbul, when constitutional reforms were seen interrupted at granting more local autonomy. However, the situation was peculiar for Hussein, who arrived in Mecca in the midst of the Young Turk Revolution, which brought the Young Turks (Committee of Union and Progress) to power. Upon his arrival, he met CUP representatives who greeted him as the "Constitutional Sharif," intending to gauge his response to such a designation. He replied: "Verily these are the lands of God in which nothing will ever stand except the Shariah of God [...] The constitution of the lands of God is the Shariah of God and the Sunnah of His Prophet". His reply reflected a long standing political practice of the Hejaz, where governance rested on Islamic law and Sharifian custom as opposed to Ottoman secular constitutionalism. In early 1914 he and his family discussed possible Ottoman retaliation, but their concern centered on the preservation of Hejazi autonomy advocating for a broader Arab political program.

==== Religious stances ====
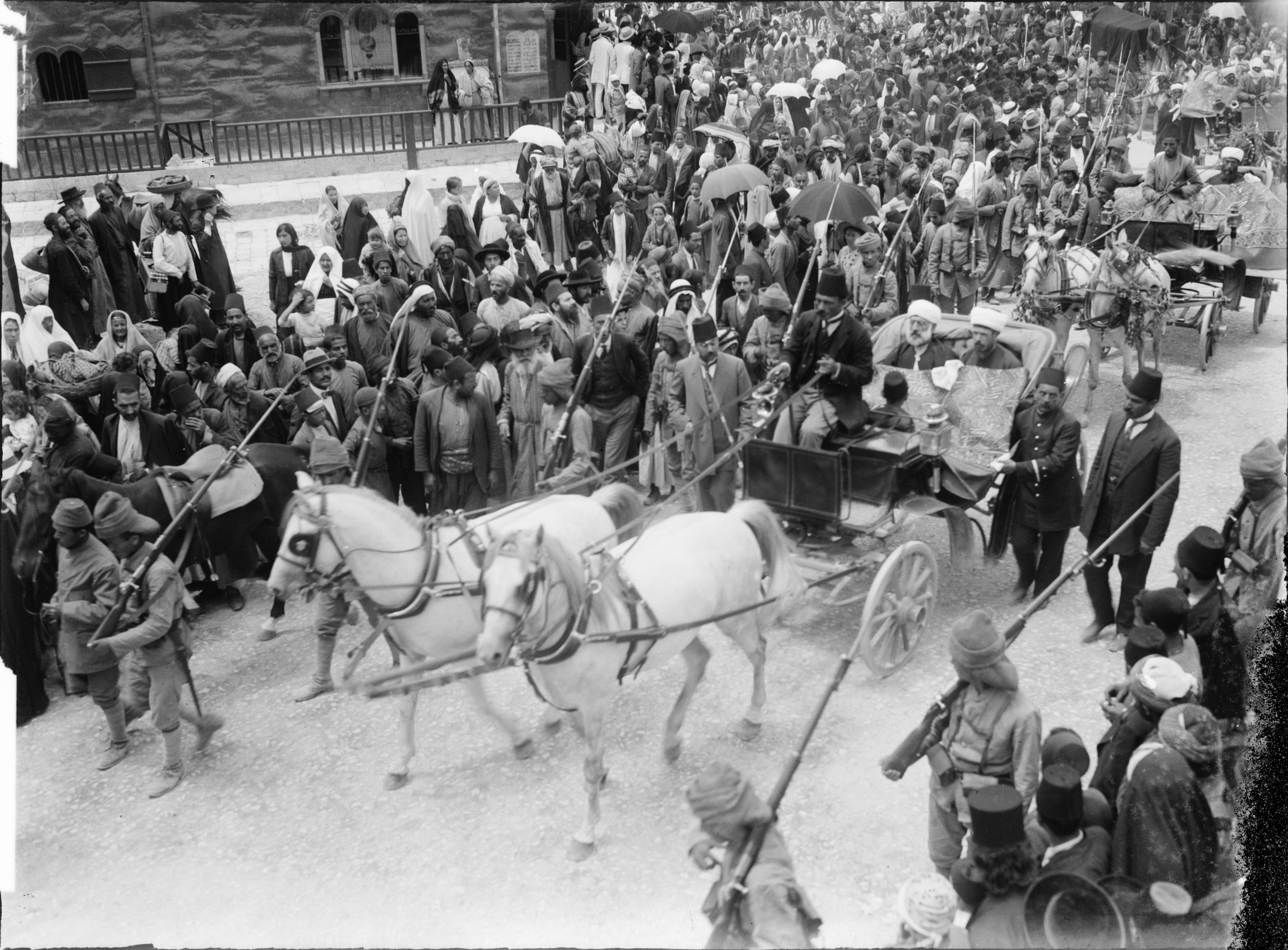
Hussein bin Ali brings a holy carpet to Jerusalem in 1914; The Sharif can be seen in the carriage with the Mufti of Jerusalem.

His main teacher was Ahmad Zayni Dahlan, with whom he became a hafiz. He had a Shafi'i and Hanafi education, but also allied with the Malikis and opposed the Wahhabis, at a time when adherence to a madhhab was more fluid.

==== Campaign in 'Asir (1911) ====
In 1911, Hussein became involved in an Ottoman campaign in 'Asir; the Committee of Union and Progress requested his support to fight Muhammad ibn Ali al-Idrisi, who had recently revolted there and proclaimed the Idrisid Emirate. Hussein was very supportive of this campaign because 'Asir traditionally belonged to the Hejaz, and al-Idrisi presence in the area severed his financial and political ties with 'Asir. He gathered an army of about 5,000 men from the Aqil and Bisha tribes, both tribes being from 'Asir, in Mecca and then began to march against al-Idrisi. After an initial defeat due to the heat and a cholera epidemic, he managed to inflict two heavy defeats on the Idrisid forces.

Then, he managed to break the siege of Abha, which was being conducted by al-Idrisi forces and where Suleiman Pasha, the Ottoman governor of the city, was entrenched. Overall, he was able to defeat the opposing forces. However, during this campaign, he seems to have been shocked by the violence of the Ottoman troops against the revolted and had a heated dispute with the Ottoman governor of Abha, Suleiman Pasha, after he began wanting to administer the territories he managed to reconquer according to Bedouin and Sharifian norms, as previously. This led to a rupture between the two commanders, and Hussein decided to withdraw from 'Asir after having pursued the defeated Idrisid forces for some time.

The Asir dispute contributed to growing distrust between Hussein and Ottoman officials but his actions were still operating in the existing political and religious framework of the Hijaz.

=== The Arab Revolt ===
==== Pan-Arabism and relationship with the Ottomans ====
The flag of the Arab Revolt was the flag of Hussein bin Ali. The flag consists of three horizontal stripes (black, white, and green) and a red triangle on the hoist side. Each color has a symbolic meaning : black represents the Abbasid dynasty or the Rashidun caliphs, white represents the Umayyad dynasty, and green represents Islam (or possibly, but it's not certain, the Fatimid dynasty). The red triangle represents the Hashemite dynasty, to which Hussein bin Ali belonged. The flag became a symbol of Arab nationalism and unity and is still used today in various forms in the flags of Egypt, Jordan, Iraq, Kuwait, Sudan, Syria, the United Arab Emirates, Yemen, Palestine, and Libya.

Although there is no formal evidence suggesting that Hussein bin Ali was inclined towards Arab nationalism before 1916, the rise of Turkish nationalism strongly displeased the Hashemites and Bedouins. Additionally, the increasing centralization of the Ottoman Empire, the progressive prohibition of Arabic in teaching, Turkification policies, and the settlement of Turkish colonists in Arab areas worried and frightened Arabs throughout the empire. In the Hijaz, concern over Ottoman centralization was connected to longstanding autonomy of the Sharifiate and its religious basis rather than to emerging ethnic nationalism. His private deliberations with his sons help showcase how the question of whether to revolt or not was framed in terms military realties, Ottoman pressure, and local autonomy.

In 1908, the Hejaz Railway was completed, allowing the Turks to strengthen their control over the Hejaz and provide a rapid response capability to reinforce their garrisons in Mecca and Medina. Efforts to Integrate the region were resisted locally because they threatened long standing administrative usage rather than ethnic identity. It was built under constant threat of Arab raids, such as those from the Harb tribe, which demonstrated their hostility towards the project. Furthermore, in April 1915, the Ottoman government began a policy of extermination of the minorities in the Ottoman Empire through various genocides. Local opposition to the railway stemmed from fears that direct military communication would diminish Sharifian authority and allow central rule over tribal regions. This frightened the Arabs, who were the largest minority in the Empire, and was openly criticized by Hussein bin Ali.

These oppositions with the Turks became so violent that they overshadowed those that existed in Arab society and Bedouin society; and many rival tribes to the Hashemites rallied behind their leadership.

A nationalist and anti-colonial Arab movement developed, mainly in Ottoman Syria, where Arab intellectuals and newspapers called for the restoration of the caliphate in the hands of a Quraysh, and especially for the acquisition of Arab independence from the Ottoman Empire. The relationship between Hussein and the Committee of Union and Progress worsened even more after the discovery and foiling of a plot by Enver Pasha to assassinate Hussein.

All of these points led to a violent rupture between Arab elites and the Ottoman political class, and are reflected in Hussein's later proclamation of independence, where he presented his struggle as a religious and anti-colonial one.

Twenty days after the start of the Armenian genocide in the Ottoman Empire, Hussein bin Ali's son, Faisal, met with the leaders of the revolutionary organization Al-Fatat in Damascus. They assured him of their support in case of revolt and express willingness to support his leadership if he initiated a revolt.

When Hussein took up the pan-Arab claims in 1916, after his proclamation of independence, he became the leading figure behind whom the pan-Arabs rallied, and is therefore frequently regarded as the father of pan-Arabism.

During World War I, Hussein initially remained allied with the Ottomans but began secret negotiations with the British on the advice of his son, Abdullah, who had served in the Ottoman parliament up to 1914 and was convinced that it was necessary to separate from the increasingly nationalistic Ottoman administration.

==== Relationship with the British ====
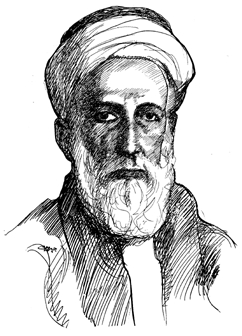
Drawing by Khalil Gibran, 1916

Following deliberations at Ta'if between Hussein and his sons in June 1915, during which Faisal counselled caution, Ali argued against rebellion and Abdullah advocated action and encouraged his father to enter into correspondence with Sir Henry McMahon; over the period 14 July 1915 to 10 March 1916, a total of ten letters, five from each side, were exchanged between Sir Henry McMahon and Sherif Hussein. McMahon was in contact with British Foreign Secretary Edward Grey throughout, and Grey was to authorise and be ultimately responsible for the correspondence. Earlier, in February and April 1914, Hussein's son met British officials in Cairo to assess potential support should a clash with Ottoman authorities arise. The British avoided commitments at the time, and discussion remained exploratory.

British concern during this time was the strategic value of Hejaz in preventing the Ottomans from accessing Egypt and the Suez canal, a view that was compatible with Hussein's own defensive priorities. The British Secretary of State for War, Field Marshal Lord Kitchener, appealed to him for assistance in the conflict on the side of the Triple Entente. Starting in 1915, as indicated by an exchange of letters with Lieutenant Colonel Sir Henry McMahon, the British High Commissioner in the Sultanate of Egypt, Hussein seized the opportunity and demanded recognition of an Arab nation that included the Hejaz and other adjacent territories as well as approval for the proclamation of an Arab Caliphate of Islam. High Commissioner McMahon accepted and assured him that his assistance would be rewarded by an Arab empire encompassing the entire span between Egypt and Persia, with the exception of British possessions and interests in Kuwait, Aden, and the Syrian coast. However, at that time, the British scarcely thought about the promises made; their primary concern was winning the war and dismantling the Ottoman Empire. The fate of the Arab populations and the division of territory were left for a future date.

According to Ekrem Buğra Ekinci, the links between Hussein and the British should not be overestimated. The deep-rooted reason for the Arab revolt, according to him, remains the persecutions and abuse carried out by the Young Turks against the Arabs of the Ottoman Empire, and is not necessarily linked to British support. This support would therefore be contingent and the revolt would have still occurred without their help. This point was shared at the time by Abbas II of Egypt, the last Khedive of Egypt, even though he was a sympathizer of the Young Turks.

==== The Arab Revolt proper, June 1916 to October 1918 ====
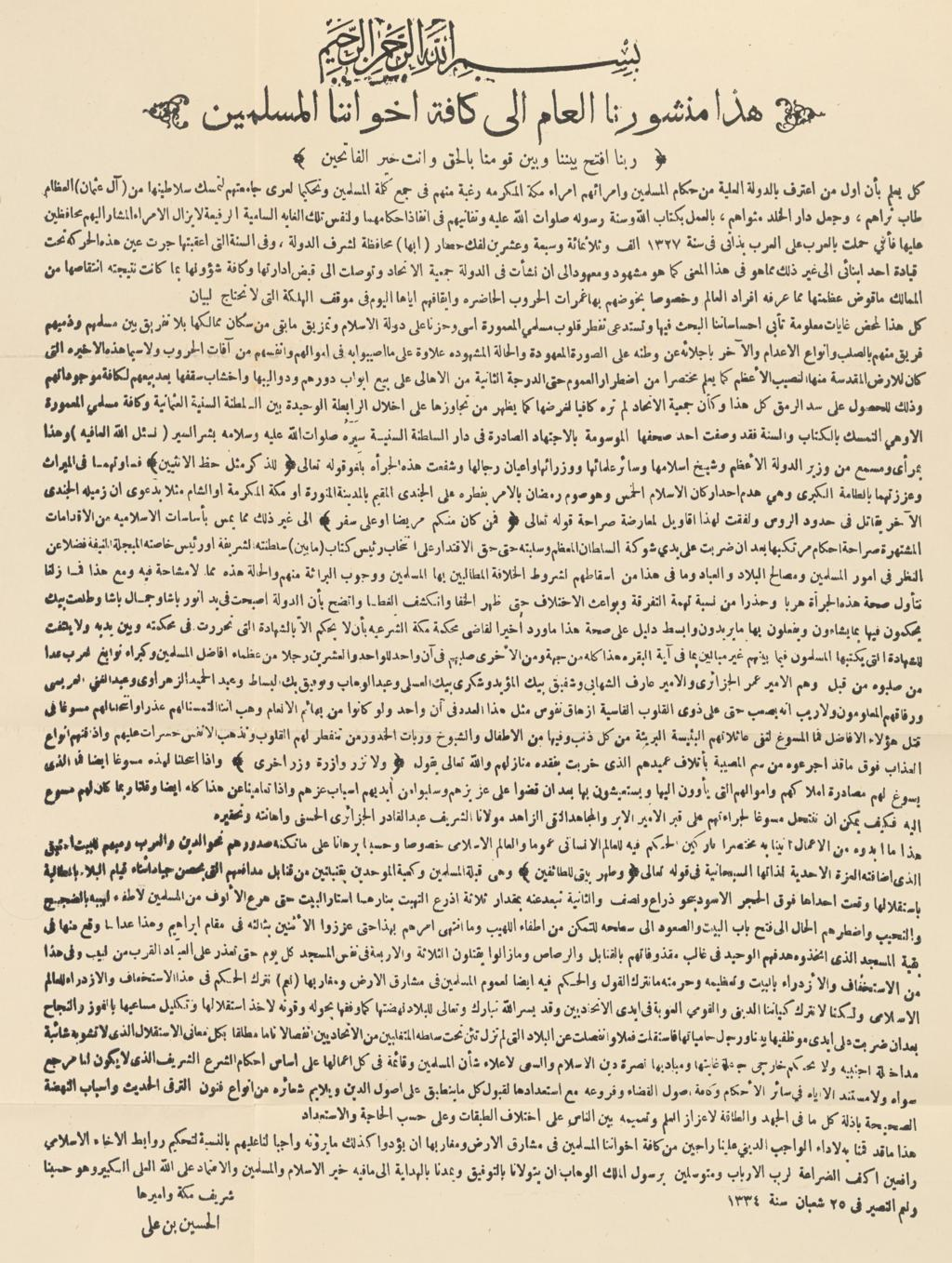
Proclamation of independence of Hussein, 27 June 1916. In it, Hussein only used religious reasons, and not nationalist ones, to explain why he was revolting.

Hussein decided to join the Allied camp immediately, because of information that he would soon be deposed as Sharif of Mecca by the Ottoman government in favor of Sharif Ali Haidar, leader of the rival Zaʻid family. The much-publicized executions of the Arab nationalist leaders in Damascus led Hussein to fear for his life if he was deposed in favour of Ali Haidar. The revolt proper began on 10 June 1916, when Hussein proclaimed the independence of the Kingdom of Hejaz and ordered his supporters to attack the Ottoman garrison in Mecca.

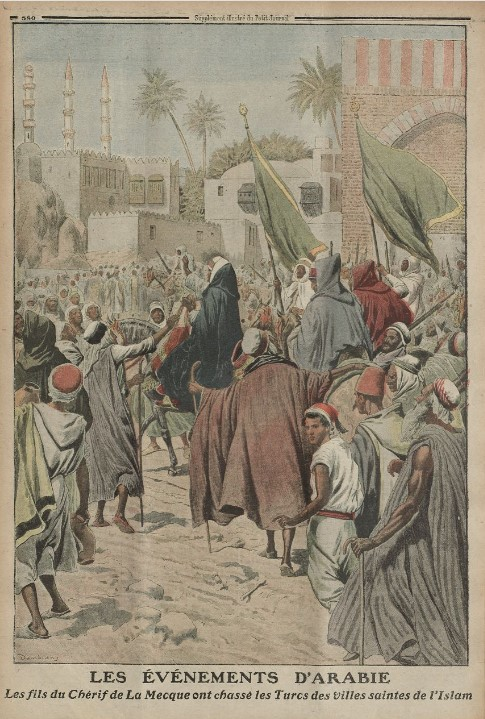
Illustration from Le Petit Journal depicting the sons of Hussein bin Ali as they liberate Mecca, 16 July 1916

In the Battle of Mecca, there ensued over a month of bloody street fighting between the out-numbered, but far better armed Ottoman troops and Hussein's tribesmen. Indiscriminate Ottoman artillery fire, set fire to the veil covering the Kaaba and turned out to be a potent propaganda weapon for the Hashemites, who portrayed the Ottomans as desecrating Islam's most holy site. Hashemite forces in Mecca were joined by Egyptian troops sent by the British, who provided much needed artillery support, and took Mecca on 9 July 1916. Ottoman record indicate their forces lacked ammunition, and could not be resupplied which contributed to the collapse of their resistance rather than purely battlefield defeated. Also on 10 June, another of Hussein's sons, the Emir Abdullah, attacked Ta'if, a hill station near Mecca, which after an initial repulse settled down into a siege. With the British-Egyptian artillery support, Abdullah took Ta'if on 22 September 1916. Ottoman sources show that the garrison held out over three months under siege conditions, but shortages of artillery shells and food made continued defense impossible. The availability of British supplied artillery to Abdullah was decisive.

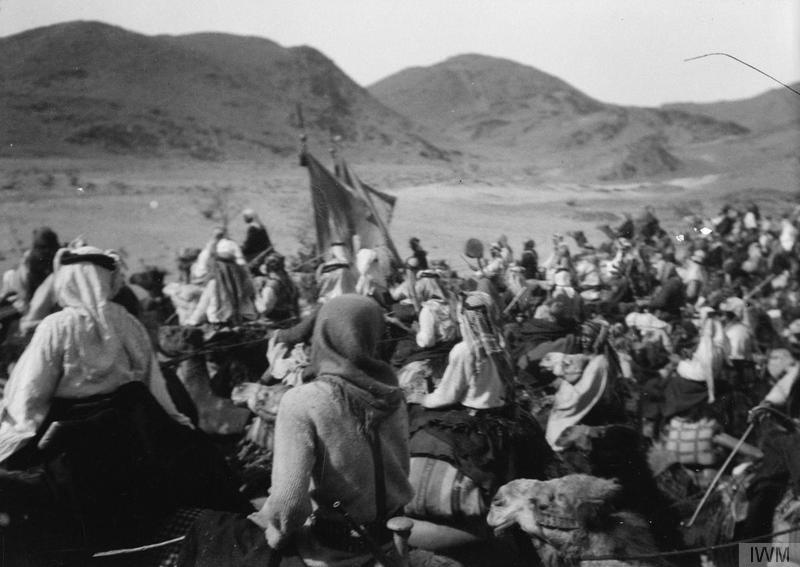
Ageyl bodyguards of Faisal

After this, and for most of the war, Hussein's sons directed the fighting; most notably Faisal, future Faisal I of Iraq, and Abdullah, future Abdullah I of Jordan. Hussein mostly stayed in Mecca to direct the operations, while his sons were fighting. The Arab revolt laid siege to Medina but wasn't able to take it for a year, thus impeding the operations. During this battle, the Ottomans killed and deported the civilian Arabic population of Medina into the Syrian desert, an event hidden by the pretense of doing "Seferberlik", or mobilization. On 2 November 1916 (6 Muharram 1335), Emir Abdullah called a meeting of majlis where he read a letter in which "Husayn ibn Ali was recognized as sovereign of the Arab nation. Then all those present arose and proclaimed him Malik al-Arab, King of the Arabs". During the whole duration of the war, Hussein's troops stayed underequipped and lacking artillery – which the Allies didn't want to give, seeing that front as utopical and not as important as the fight was in the Western front, among others. This lack of artillery and high mobility; since most of the troops were mounted Bedouins, pushed them to use guerilla tactics in the desert; for example by severing Ottoman supplies with the bombings of specific sections of the Hejaz railway.

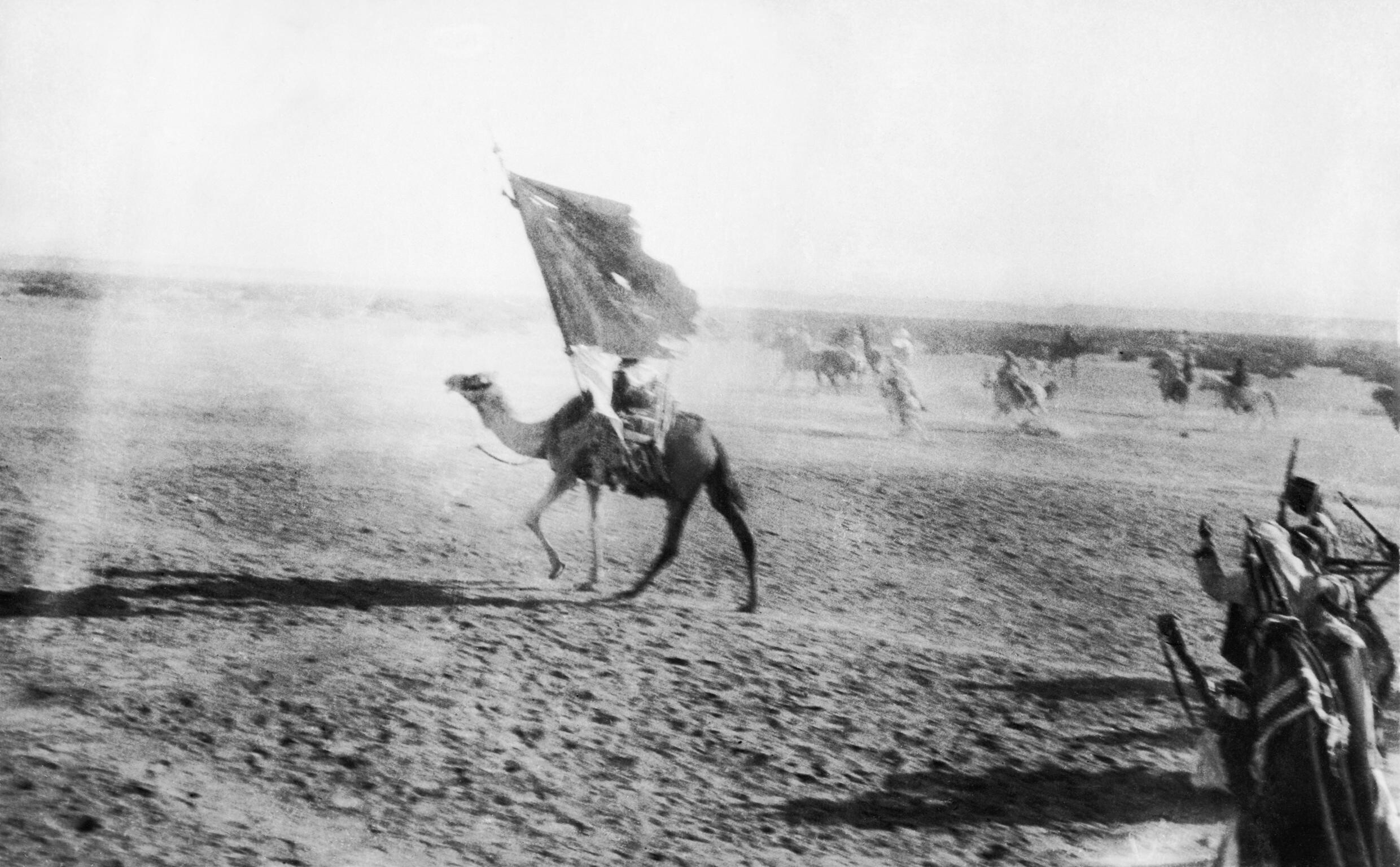
A flag bearer mounted on a camel leading the triumphal entry into Aqaba.

After the fall of Medina, the Arab troops were able to secure Aqaba quickly and this allowed them to project themselves farther; they still ambushed Ottoman troops, such as during the battle of Wadi Musa, helping themselves with their superior knowledge of the Arabian and Syrian deserts. This conflict was marked by widespread ethnic cleansing directed at non-Turkish populations in the areas affected. The troops of Hussein also committed war crimes, deciding to execute Turkish troops responsible of the Tafas massacre against Arabian civilians, instead of taking them prisoners.

After the fall of Aqaba, the Arab forces, supplemented with British auxiliaries and with the design of joining forces with the British main armies, which were trying to break out of Egypt and Palestine, managed to join them. Ottoman military correspondence shows that the loss of Aqaba exposed the northern supply corridor, but the main limitations on Ottoman operations in Palestine remained logistics rather than manpower diverted south. During the Battle of Megiddo, in September 1918, Hussein's troops led by his son Faisal, joined the British forces and managed to utterly destroy the 4th, 7th and 8th Ottoman armies, and push into retreat the Yildirim Army Group, comprising the German Asian Corps and led at the time by Mustafa Kemal Atatürk, contributing to the breakdown of defenses already severely weakened by lack of supplies in Palestine, and finally breaking inside the Ottoman Empire, and finally breaking inside the Ottoman Empire. The battle happened at the same time as the Vardar offensive in the Balkans, which managed to overrun Bulgarian defences, thus opening the Balkans and ultimately Austria-Hungary. Since the war was seemingly won, and the Ottoman defences were crumbling, Faisal projected himself towards Damascus, which he took 1 October 1918. After this, he engaged in the pursuit to Haritan, pursuing the remnants of the Yildirim Army Group and ultimately taking Aleppo on 25 October 1918, thus ending the war on that front.

=== King of Hejaz ===
The US State Department quotes an aide-mémoire dated 24 October 1917 given by the Arab Bureau to the American Diplomatic Agency in Cairo confirming that "...Britain, France and Russia agreed to recognize the Sherif as lawful independent ruler of the Hejaz and to use the title of "King of the Hejaz" when addressing him, and a note to this effect was handed to him on December 10, 1916".

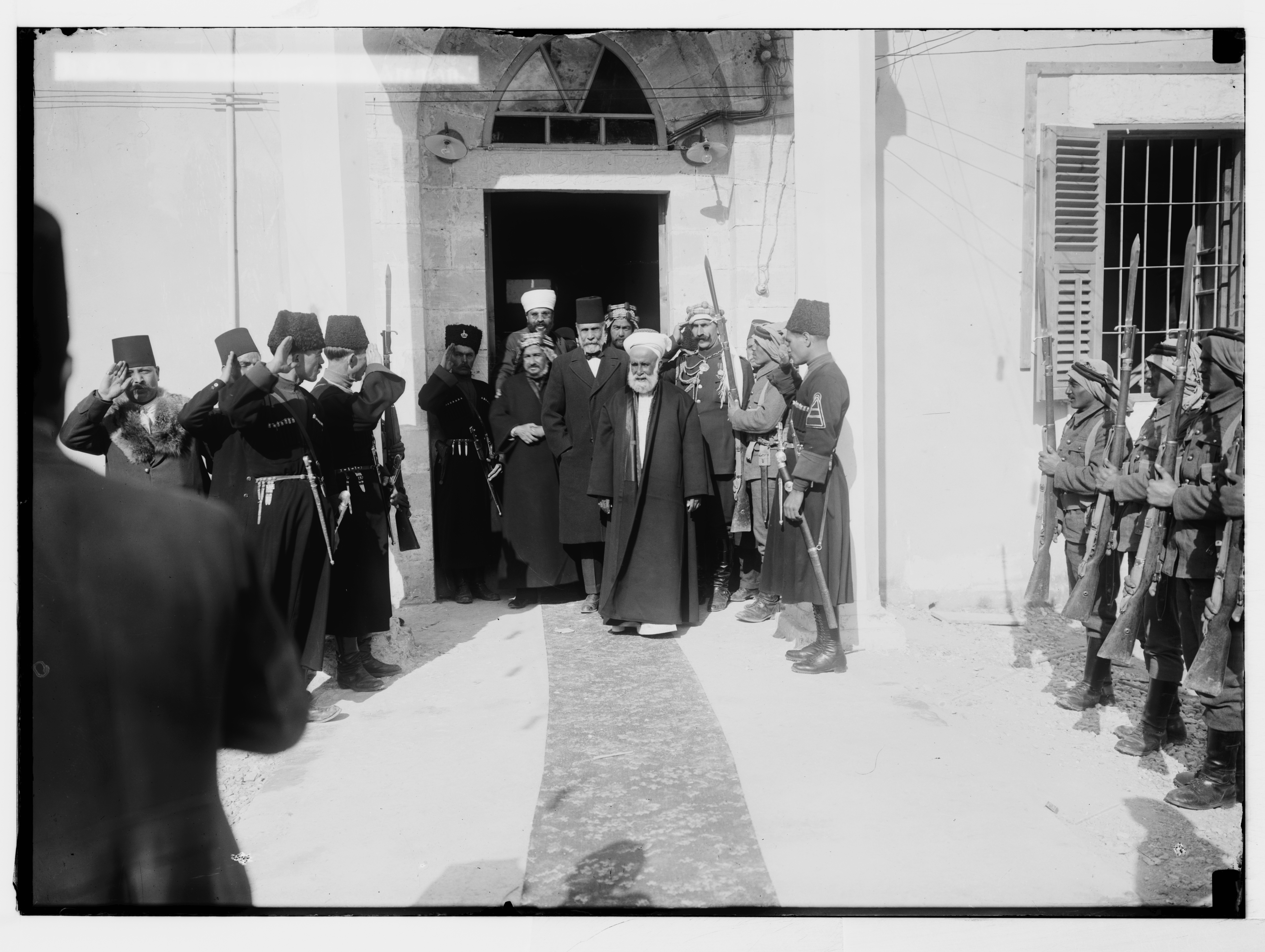
Hussein in Amman, Transjordan, before he left for Aqaba, 1921

When Hussein declared himself King of the Hejaz, he also declared himself King of the Arab lands (malik bilad-al-Arab). His intention wasn't to create a centralized modern state but instead an overlord structure over multiple Arab rulers.This only aggravated his conflict with Abdulaziz ibn Saud, which was already present because of their differences in religious beliefs and with whom he had fought before the First World War, siding with fellow anti-Saudis, the Ottomans in 1910.

==== Rule ====
To clean up the image of his rule, Hussein initiated a series of reforms, including measures to avoid offending Muslims from French or British colonies who undertook the Hajj. He addressed the threat of mangy dogs, attempted to ensure the security of the Hajj routes from bandits, and sought to hide the region's slave markets which had persisted despite the Turkish government's 1908 ban to prevent offending French Muslims.

He undertook the last major restoration of the Masjid al-Haram in 1920 and a restoration of the mosques of Palestine and more specifically of al-Aqsa mosque, for which he funded 26,672 liras.

==== Armenian genocide ====
Starting from 1917, Hussein made decisions to protect the Armenian refugees and those residing in his lands from the Armenian genocide. Armenian deportees began to arrive in Ottoman Syria in mid-1915, and large numbers remained in the region through 1916 with massacres peaking spring and late 1916. Survivors continued around Aleppo, Rakka, and Deir ez-Zor into early 1917. First, he condemned the genocide publicly as early as 1916, stating "We specifically bring to the world's condemnation the atrocities committed against the Greeks and Armenians, atrocities that our holy law can only disapprove of". In this regard, he promulgated in 1917, in a decree: "In the name of Most Merciful Allah and our prophet Muhammad, we are addressing our Arab brothers (...) to take Armenian refugees in their families, to share with them their belongings – camels, food, shelter, blankets – and share everything that you have in excess, and everything that you can give to people."

In April 1918, as part of his conquest of the Syrian territories in which the Armenian genocide took place, he issued a decree to protect Armenians from persecution and allow them to settle in peace, in which he ordered :

"What is requested of you is to protect and to take good care of everyone from the Jacobite Armenian community living in your territories and frontiers and among your tribes; to help them in all of their affairs and defend them as you would defend yourselves, your properties and children, and provide everything they might need whether they are settled or moving from place to place, because they are the Protected People of the Muslims (Ahl Dimmat al-Muslimin) – about whom the Prophet Muhammad (may Allah grant him His blessings and peace) said: "Whosoever takes from them even a rope, I will be his adversary on the day of Judgment". This is among the most important things we require of you to do and expect you to accomplish, in view of your noble character and determination".

Armenian survivors were still present in scattered communities as late as 1917, making such protections meaningful for thousands who had escaped killing during 1916.

The Armenian National Institute considers it to be the oldest declaration by a head of state to recognize the Armenian genocide. Alongside this, he gave citizenship to his Armenian subjects. According to survivors of the Armenian genocide, such as Levon Yotnakhparian, Hussein personally received him and was shocked by the news of what was happening. He also supported Armenian survivors and provided men and protection for expeditions in the Syrian desert aimed at rescuing Armenian deportees. According to testimonies, this method is said to have saved up to 4,000 people from the genocide, in collaboration with Hussein al-Attrache, a Druze chieftain who then disguised the refugees as Druzes. His son, Faisal, provided free transportation to all Armenian refugees for their trip towards the British refugee camp in Damascus and free use of the Hejaz railway, even if that meant impeding on the war effort.

=== Following World War I ===
In the aftermath of the war, the Arabs found themselves freed from centuries of Ottoman rule. Hussein's son Faisal was made King of Syria, but this kingdom proved short-lived, as the Middle East came under mandate rule of France and the United Kingdom. The British Government subsequently made Faisal and his brother Abdullah kings of Iraq and Transjordan, respectively.

==== The issue of Palestine and deterioration in British relationship ====
Starting at the end of the war, Hussein found himself in severe conflict with Britain's views on the subject of Palestine. In January and February 1918, Hussein received the Hogarth Message and Bassett Letter in response to his requests for an explanation of the Balfour Declaration and Sykes-Picot Agreement respectively. Despite their explanations, he stated that Palestine should be included within the borders of the newly founded Arab Kingdom and should refuse Zionist settlers, even if he was ready to accept Jewish people in Palestine, notably those who already lived there and were not coming from foreign countries. However, even after an assurance by McMahon, Hussein did not receive the lands promised by their British allies. During the negotiations, the boundaries had been discussed explicitly, and British representatives had accepted almost all of the proposed limits. The assurances are understood as binding commitments for the postwar settlement. McMahon claimed that the proposed lands to be taken in by the new Arab State were not purely Arab. In actuality, McMahon refused to hand over the new lands as the areas in question had already been claimed by the new British ally, France.

Having received a British subsidy totalling £6.5m between 1916 and April 1919, in May 1919, the subsidy was reduced to £100K monthly (from £200K), dropped to £75K from October, £50K in November, £25K in December until February 1920 after which no more payments were made. Hussein saw British subsidy reduction as the British minimizing services he provided. During the campaign, British commanders had privately acknowledged the revolt helped to tie down Ottoman forces that would have likely been used against him.

The British were not disposed to fulfill their promises to Hussein, as Colonel Wilson stated in secret correspondence :

"At one time, our Arabic copies of Sir H. MacMahon's letters to the Grand Sherif could not be found; if they are still unavailable it may be somewhat awkward when King Hussein produces the originals. (...) Failing a satisfactory solution King Hussein will have some grounds for considering that Great Britain has broken her pledged word."

In 1919, King Hussein refused to ratify the Treaty of Versailles. In August 1920, five days after the signing of the Treaty of Sèvres, Curzon asked Cairo to procure Hussein's signature to both treaties and agreed to make a payment of £30,000 conditional on signature. Hussein declined and in 1921, stated that he could not be expected to "affix his name to a document assigning Palestine to the Zionists and Syria to foreigners". His refusal should be kept in context of previous negotiations that had been made. By 1917 his kingship had been recognized by the Allied governments, following the months in which his forces repelled advancements by the Ottomans. He refused again to accept the Balfour Declaration in 1923, and stated : "I look at the people of Palestine as I look at my own family, without distinction between Muslim, Christian, Jewish, or nationalist".

In January 1924, Hussein received in Amman a Zionist delegation led by rabbi Yaakov Meir and a British colonel. Despite having welcomed them with respect, he would not change his position. As his stance was seen by the United Kingdom as extremist, the British and the Zionist media engaged in press campaigns against Hussein, where his positions were misrepresented. They also engaged heavily against his Caliphate, calling it illegitimate. After him becoming Caliph, he continued on this path, stating: "I consider Zionism unjust towards Muslims, Christians and Orthodox Jews, and as a protector of justice, I will resist this unjust Zionism". This contributed to aggravate his relationship with the Zionists towards a breaking point.

==== Caliphate ====
Prior to 1924, Hussein had already exercise effective authority in the Hijaz, mobilized tribes, and defended autonomy of Mecca against the centralizing policies of the Istanbul government. During this period his religious leadership and administration over pilgrimage security strengthened his political legitimacy among Arabs.After the Caliphate was abolished by the Turkish Grand National Assembly on 3 March 1924, Hussein was proclaimed as Caliph. The accounts on the official date and proceedings vary, some place the beginning of the Caliphate on 3 March 1924, when Hussein would have declared himself Caliph at his son Abdullah's winter camp in Shunah, Transjordan. Other accounts, such as a Reuters dispatch, instead set the date as 7 March 1924, and describe Hussein bin Ali being elected as a caliph by Muslims from "Mesopotamia, Transjordan, and Hejaz". A third counting of the official date takes place when he received the homage of the majority of the Arab population in Amman as the caliph, on 11 March 1924. Finally, a fourth version places the date on Friday, 14 March 1924, when Hussein is evidently enthroned as caliph in Baghdad during the Friday prayer. In any case, all sources agree on a date in March 1924, shortly after the abolition of the Ottoman caliphate by Mustafa Kemal Atatürk. Hussein's prior role as guardian of the Holy cities and his refusal to accept Ottoman centralization in 1913-1914 made the idea of a caliphate centered in the Hijaz plausible to many Muslims, especially those concerned that Istanbul no longer represented Islamic stewardship. Separately, he made statements in support of the Ottoman dynasty, which had been ruined and exiled from Turkey. In this regard, he declared:

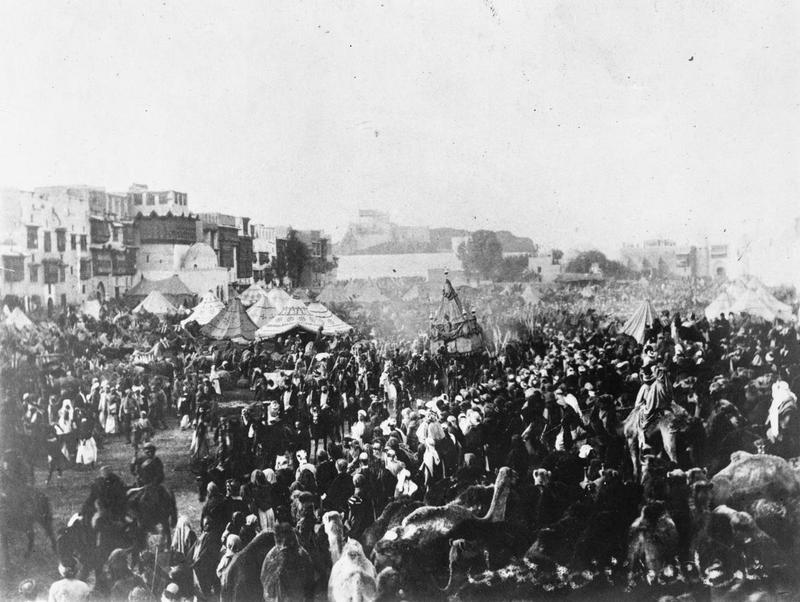
Mahmal of Hussein bin Ali in Mecca, 1916–1918

The services rendered by the Ottoman family to Islam and Muslims are undeniable; their heroism cannot be belittled. The recent decision regarding the family [exile] has pierced the hearts and saddened the spirits of Muslims. Therefore, we see it as an obligation of Islamic brotherhood to meet the needs of the family and prevent them from experiencing financial difficulties. Those who wish to participate in this great endeavor should express their intentions to our representatives in Mecca.

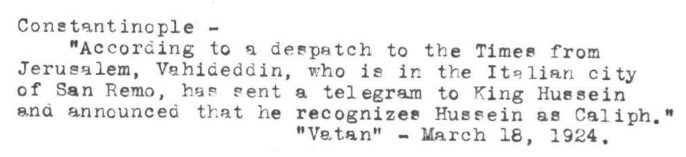
Testimony of Vatan, quoted by The Times, on the approval given to Hussein's caliphate by Vehideddin, a nickname of Mehmed VI

In the same perspective, he financially supported the members of the exiled Ottoman dynasty to prevent them from being ruined. Despite his complicated financial and economic situation, he provided them with 2400 liras. The claim to the title was recognized by a large part of the Hejazi, Levantine and more generally Arabic Muslim population. He also received the support of Mehmed VI, on 18 March 1924, one of the last Ottoman Caliphs and the last Ottoman Sultan, according to The Times and Vatan, that reported that he supported him as the new Caliph.

The French viewed this proclamation as "the worst possible solution," in the words of Hubert Lyautey, who also defended that the Ottoman Caliphate was better for French interests than the Sharifian Caliphate. They believed that having a new influential caliph could risk reviving pan-Islamism, causing instability in French Muslim colonies in the event of a conflict, and potentially giving the Red Sea to the British. As a result, the French did not support it at all, preferring to wait and see how events unfolded. Meanwhile, they had the Sultan of Morocco ready to assume the caliph title if necessary, offering the French a caliph who was more aligned with their interests, albeit less significant.

To reinforce his proclamation and establish legal foundations for his caliphate, Hussein convened an Islamic Congress at Mecca in 1924, it comprised both Sunni and Shia Muslims and was thus arguably one of the most inclusive Islamic Congresses in history. The Congress held twelve sessions before being indefinitely adjourned due to the advance of Saudi forces.

His Caliphate only lasted for a few months, though, because he was invaded and defeated quickly by Abdulaziz ibn Saud. During this period, his position was weakened by the perception that the wartime agreement had not been fulfilled, which diminished potential support from other Arab regions.

==== Defeat against Saudis and abdication ====
Although the British had supported Hussein from the start of the Arab Revolt and the McMahon–Hussein Correspondence, they not only chose not to help him to repel the Saudi conquest of Hejaz, but even provided weapons to Ibn Saud, which eventually took Mecca, Medina, and Jeddah. The British offered several times to assist him and to stop supporting the Saudis, in exchange for his recognition of the Balfour Declaration, which he refused each time. According to the Institute of Contemporary Islamic Thought, the British not only supported Ibn Saud against Hussein bin Ali but they also supported him subsequently against the Ikhwan. Hussein attempted to make appeals to the League of Nations, Muslim powers, and Western powers; however, they did not intervene and merely monitored the events. The British were highly negative towards him since he assumed the caliphal title and refused to support him.

He chose to abdicate. Even after abdication he continued to describe himself as having sacrificed himself for binding commitments, and viewed his downfall as the result of those commitments being disregarded. After his abdication, another of his sons, Ali, briefly assumed the throne of the Hejaz, but then he too had to flee from the encroachment of the Saudi forces. Another of Hussein's sons, Faisal, was briefly King of Syria and later King of Iraq, while Abdullah was Emir of Transjordan. While he was in exile, he still used the title of caliph until his death.

==== Exile ====
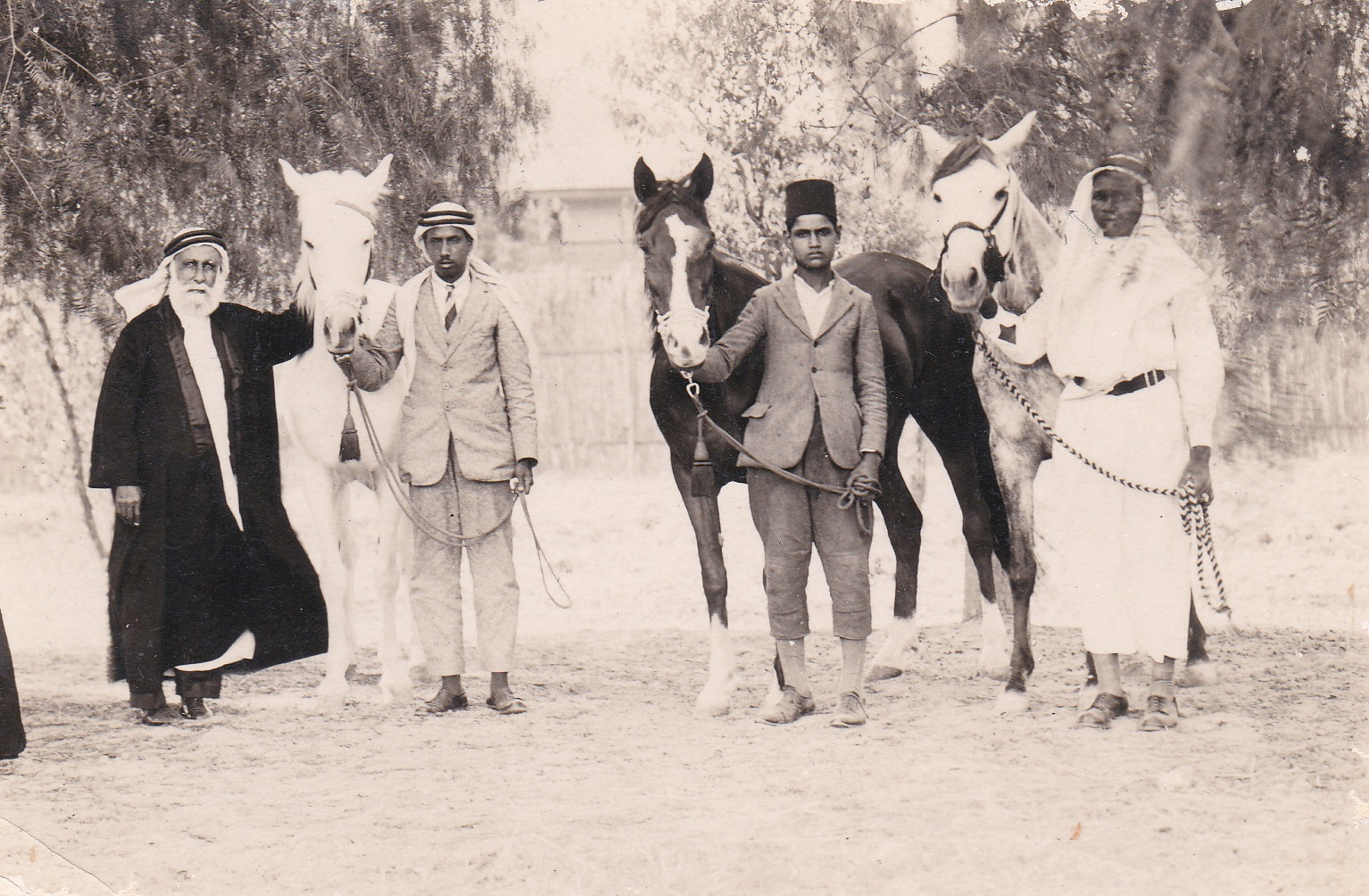
Hussein bin Ali posing with his retinue and his horses during his exile in Cyprus

King Hussein was then forced to flee to Amman, Transjordan, where his son Abdullah was Emir. He interpreted his having to flee as humiliation because since he was treated a private individual with restricted status, he was denied recognition he felt entitled to and was forced to struggle for his own dignity. During this period, King Hussein is described as having taken over control that his son wielded, and therefore was sent to live in Aqaba (which was recently transferred from Hijazi to Transjordanian sovereignty by the British). Britain – responding to Ibn Saud's plea that the Sharif be expelled from Aqaba – exiled him from Aqaba to British-controlled Cyprus.

He lived in Nicosia from 1925, with his sons coming to visit him at some times, even if his relationships with them were strained, except for Zeid who came to visit him the most. According to the British governor of Cyprus, Ronald Storrs, when he went to see Hussein, he found his son Zeid reading him the commentary of al-Bukhari on the Quran. He rarely left his home, lived an austere lifestyle, and read the Quran, religious books, he also read Arabic newspapers in the mornings. However, he still went to see horse-races and had brought Arabic horses in his exile that he treated "like his own family". Hussein also did some interviews with the press during his exile. He received some visitors, such as Sheikh Fuad al-Khatib, Muhammad Jamil Bayham, who wanted to write his biography, or the Jordanian poet Mustafa Wahbi Tal, among others. Hussein was ruined, but the local Greek Cypriot and Turkish Cypriot population considered him to be a very wealthy man and therefore tried to win his favors. Meanwhile, he was entangled in legal matters regarding property income in Egypt, among other things.

The funeral of Hussein in Jerusalem, 1931.

He tried to be friendly towards the various ethnic communities on the island but was particularly close to the Armenians of the island, seeing them as victims, like himself, of the Young Turks. Hussein did not have any documented connection with the Turkish Cypriot community; though it is possible that one exists, there is no mention of him having visited a Turkish mosque in Nicosia. He met with the Armenian Archbishop of Nicosia in 1926 and received a warm welcome, after that, he donated drums and instruments to the Armenian community of the island, including the Armenian Philharmonic Melkonian School.

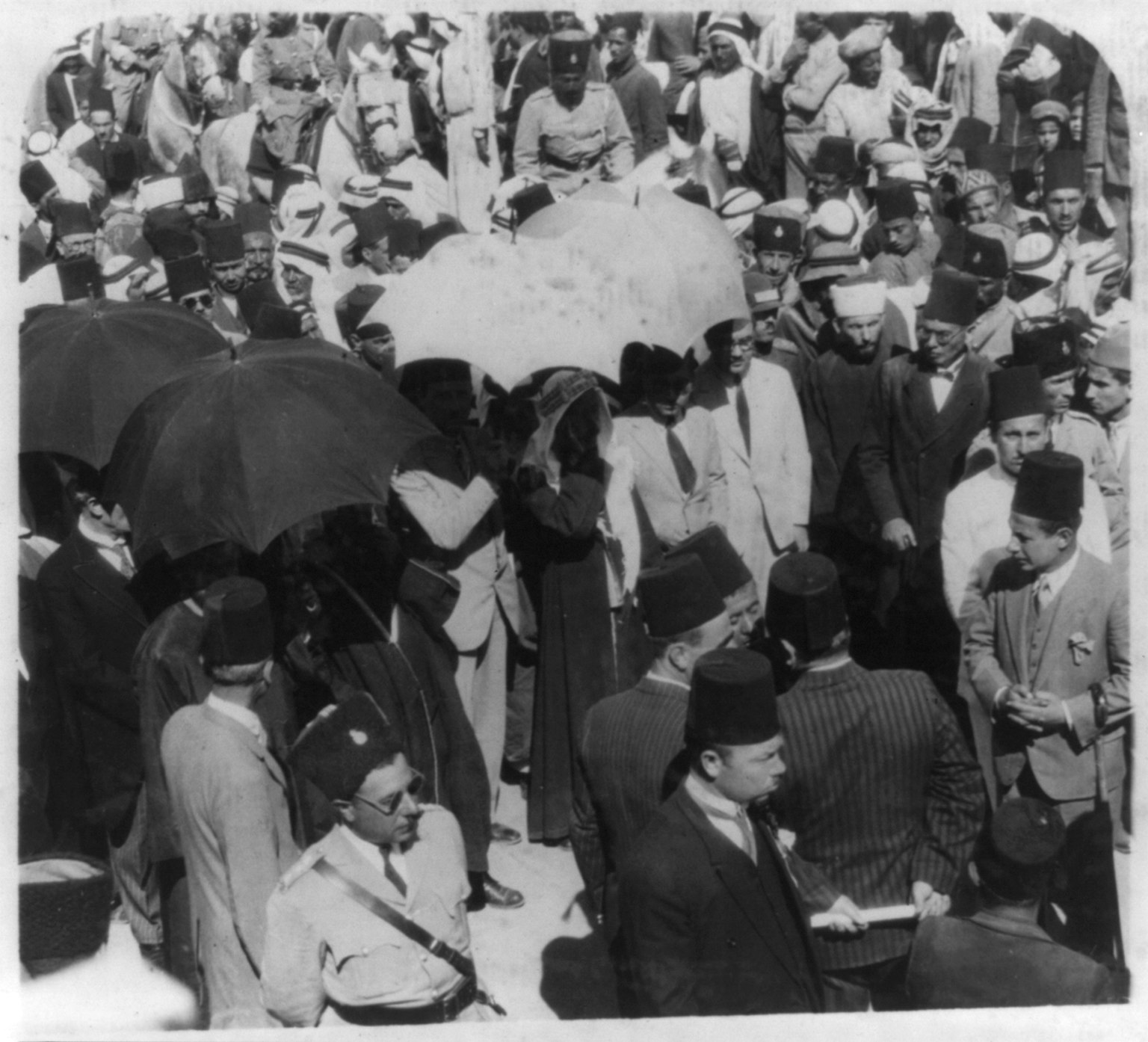
Chief mourners at funeral of Hussein. His sons King Ali and Emir Abdullah among crowd

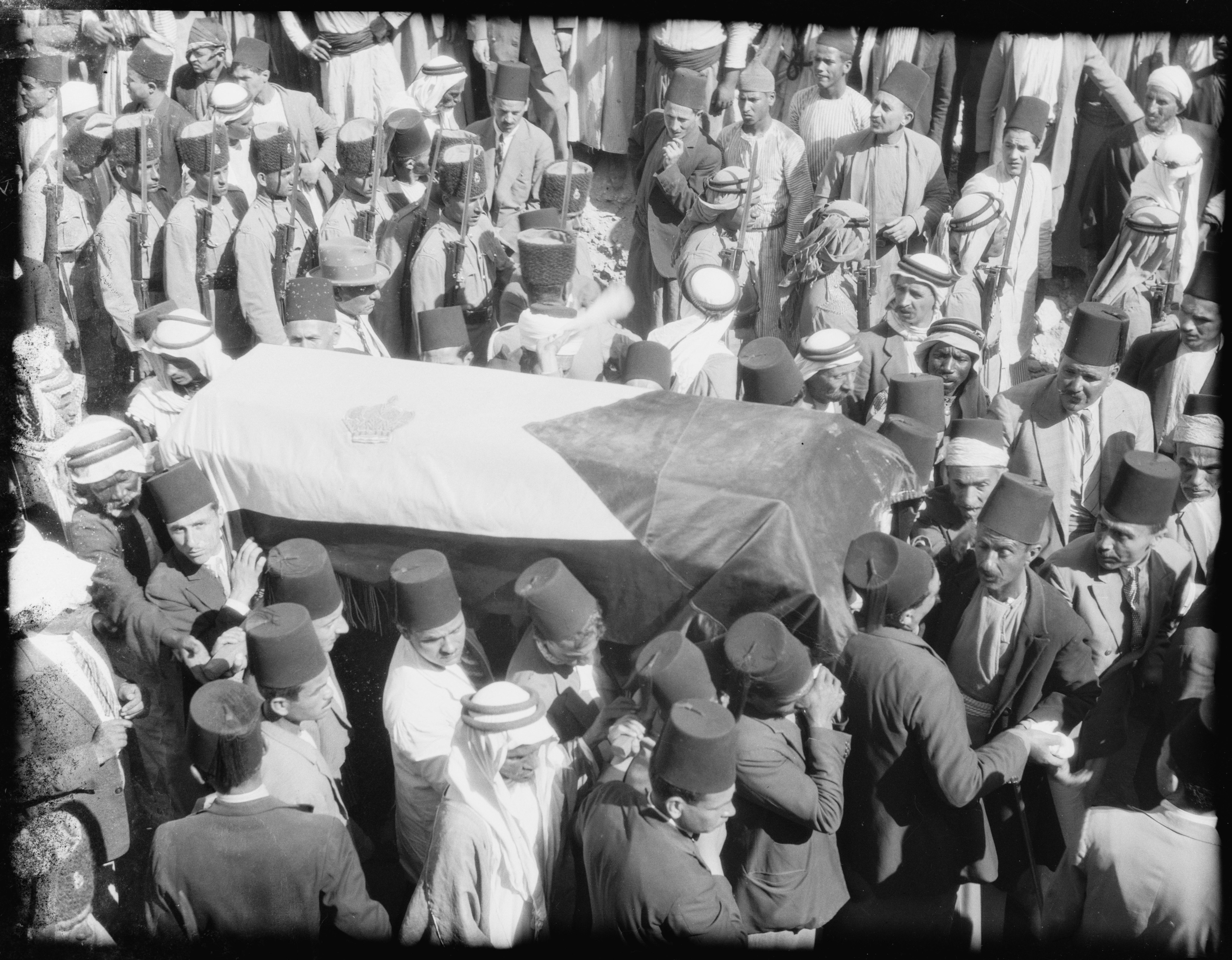
Funeral of Hussein, Jerusalem, the casket

He began to fall ill as early as 1928, but his favorite wife, Adila Khanum, died in 1929, which exacerbated his illness. She was buried at Hala Sultan Tekke, the largest Muslim shrine on the island. His two sons, Ali and Abdallah, attended the funeral and started making preparations and requesting the British for his repatriation, believing that he didn't have much time left to live and that they needed to be by his side.

==== Return and death ====
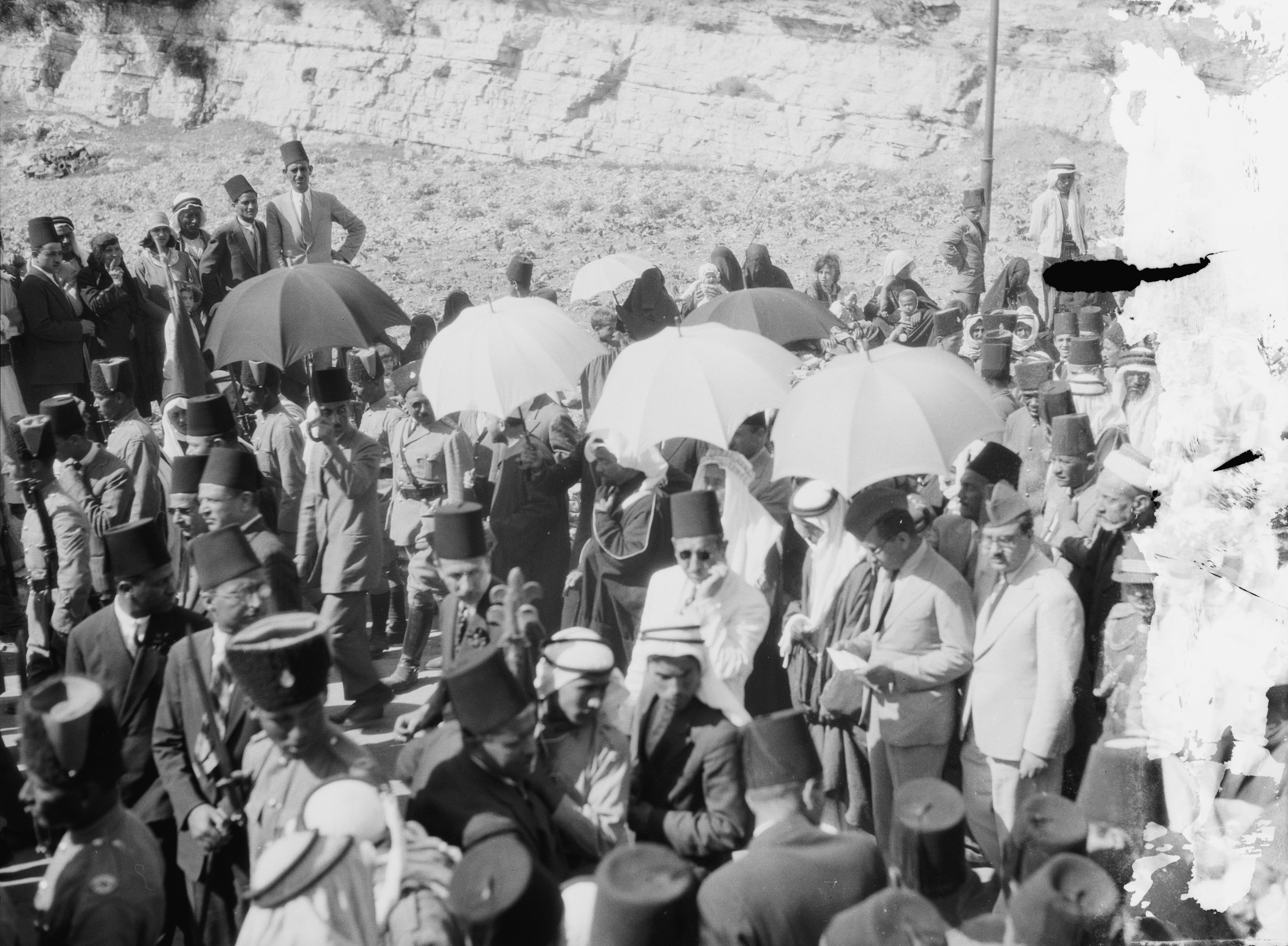
Funeral of Hussein, Jerusalem

As his health continued to deteriorate and as he was paralyzed by a stroke at age 77 in 1930, the British became increasingly inclined to send him back to the Middle East. They feared that his death would not only stir resentment among Arabs towards the United Kingdom but also potentially strain their relationships with the Hashemite rulers, all of whom were allies in the Middle East. The Saudis expressed their displeasure with rumors of Hussein's repatriation, especially after Hussein expressed his wish to be buried in Mecca, an event the Saudis feared would lead to "pro-Hashemite gatherings." Eventually, the British decided to repatriate him to Amman, with Baghdad as another option they had considered. Upon his arrival, he was greeted by a large crowd that cheered him and followed him to the Raghadan Palace. There, while in Amman, he published a series of texts in al-Yarmouk, an Arabic newspaper, where he defended his actions and stated once again that he was against the British mandate of Palestine.

He died on 4 June 1931. Hussein bin Ali was buried in Jerusalem in 1931, as he wasn't able to be buried in Mecca, as he wanted and as was the norm for Sharifs of Mecca until then, for Ibn Saud didn't want to allow him being buried there. Local dignitaries and leaders wanted him to be buried in the al-Aqsa mosque compound. This idea was kept and after a procession where 30,000 people took part, he was buried in Jerusalem: inside the Arghūniyya, a building on the Haram esh-Sharif or "Temple Mount", in a walled enclosure decorated with white marble and carpets. His son Faisal, with whom the relationship was the worse at that point, didn't attend his funerals, claiming he had "government business" to attend to.

On the window above his tomb is written the following inscription: Arabic: هَذَا قَبْرُ أَمِيرِ ٱلْمُؤْمِنِينَ ٱلْحُسَيْن بْنُ عَلِي, lit. 'Haḏa qabru ʾamīri ʾal-mūˈminīna ʾal-Ḥusayn bnu ʿAlī' which translates "This is the tomb of the Commander of the Faithful, Hussein bin Ali".

== Marriage and children ==
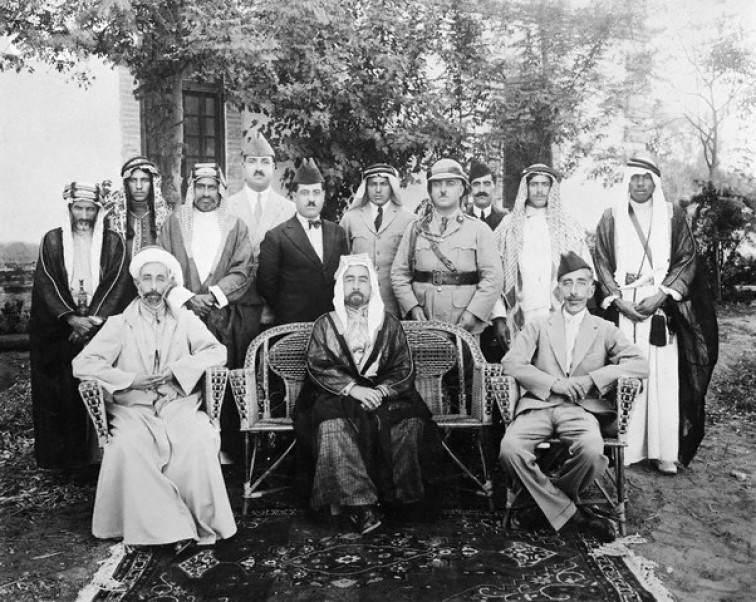
The sons of Sharif Hussein, from left to right, King Ali of Hejaz, King Abdullah I of Jordan and King Faisal I of Iraq

Hussein, who had four wives, fathered four sons and three daughters with three of his wives:

- Sharifa Abidiya bint Abdullah (died Istanbul, Ottoman Empire, 1886, buried there), eldest daughter of his paternal uncle, Amir Abdullah Kamil Pasha, Grand Sharif of Mecca;
- Madiha, a Circassian;
- Sharifa Khadija bint Abdullah (1866 – Amman, Transjordan, 4 July 1921), second daughter of Amir Abdullah Kamil Pasha, Grand Sharif of Mecca;
- Adila Khanum (Istanbul, Ottoman Empire, 1879 – Larnaca, Cyprus, 12 July 1929, buried there at the Hala Sultan, Umm Haram, Tekke), daughter of Salah Bey and granddaughter of Mustafa Rashid Pasha, sometime Grand Vizier of the Ottoman Empire;

With his first wife Abidiya bint Abdullah, he had:

- Prince Ali, last King of Hejaz married to Nafisa bint Abdullah. Parents of Aliya bint Ali. Grandparents of Sharif Ali bin al-Hussein.
- Prince Abdullah, Emir (later King) of Transjordan, married to Musbah bint Nasser, Suzdil Hanum, and Nahda bint Uman.
- Princess Fatima, married a European Muslim businessman from France.
- Prince Faisal, later King of Iraq and Syria, married to Huzaima bint Nasser. Parents of Ghazi, King of Iraq born 1912 died 4 April 1939, married his first cousin, Princess Aliya bint Ali, daughter of HM King Ali of Hejaz.

With his second wife Madiha, he had:

- Princess Saleha, married Abdullah bin Muhammed.

With his third wife Adila, he had:

- Princess Sara, married Muhammad Atta Amin in July 1933, divorced September 1933.
- Prince Zeid, who succeeded in pretense King Faisal II of Iraq upon his assassination in 1958, but never actually ruled as Iraq became a republic. Married to Fahrelnissa Kabaağaç.

== Works ==
=== Literature ===
Hussein wrote extensively, his most important papers were published in a book by Prince Ghazi bin Muhammad. Otherwise, he is known to have written a large series of articles in al-Qibla.

== Legacy ==
=== Art ===
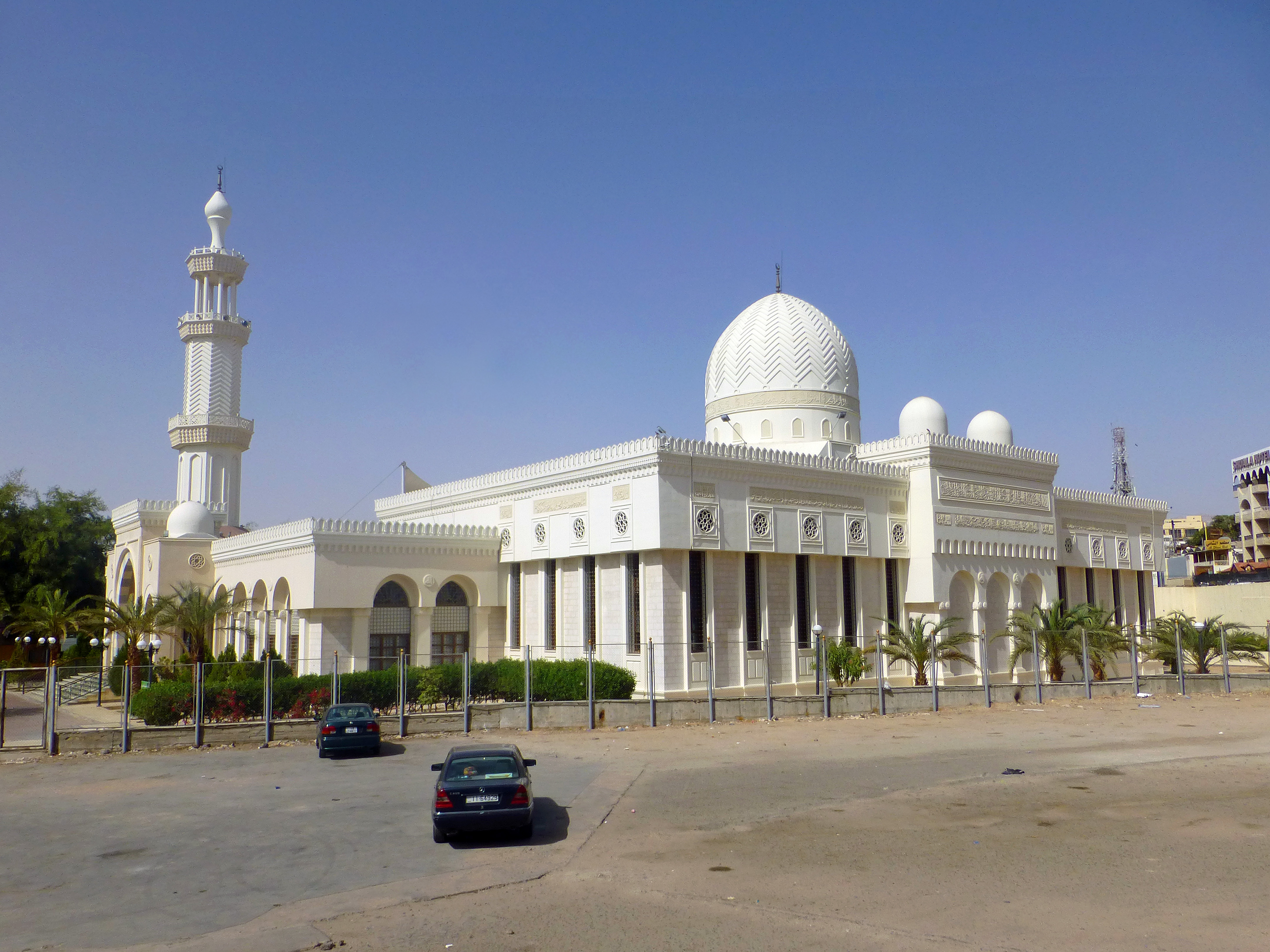
Hussein bin Ali mosque in Aqaba

Several poets wrote about him, including Ahmed Shawqi, nicknamed the Prince of Poets, who wrote a poem about his funerals and Mustafa Wahbi Tal, one of the most prominents Jordanian poets, who wrote a poem about him.

In the early 21st century, Hussein was a regular character in the 'burgeoning' Jordanian cinema.

=== Armenian genocide refugees ===
His role in the support of Armenian refugees, especially during the Armenian genocide, led him to be cited in 2014 and 2020 by Armenian Presidents Serzh Sargsyan and Armen Sarkissian as an example of tolerance and friendship between people also stressed by Jordanian Prince Hassan bin Talal. Hussein is quoted in the book Crows of the Desert from Armenian survivor Levon Yotnakhparian, when he discusses the help Hussein provided to the survivors and to save victims. This book subsequently gave birth to a movie of the same name.

For his actions during the Armenian genocide, Hussein was awarded the title of "Righteous of the Armenian genocide" by Armenian researchers. On Friday 24 April 2015, on the occasion of the centennial of the Armenian genocide, Lebanese Sheikh Maher Hammoud referenced Hussein bin Ali in his sermon condemning the genocide. The Middle East Council of Churches paid hommage to his actions.

=== Others ===
Several mosques bear his name to the present day, such as the Hussein bin Ali mosque in Aqaba, the Hussein bin Ali mosque in Ma'an or the al-Husseini mosque in Amman. A school is named after him in Ma'an. His house in Aqaba was restored in 2023 at the initiative of the Jordanian government and subsequently reopened to the public in 2024. A brigade of the Jordanian army bears his name.

In 2020, a documentary was made about him and his life by Al-Araby, which was seen more than five million times on YouTube as of May 2023. The Order of Hussein bin Ali, created in 1949 by Abdullah I of Jordan, is the highest order of Jordan.

== Decorations ==
- Grand-cordon of the Order of Muhammad Ali (Egypt)
- Grand Cordon of the Order of Leopold (Belgium)
- Grand Cross of the Legion of Honour (France)
- First Class of the Order of Osmanieh (Ottoman Empire)
- First Class of the Order of the Medjidie (Ottoman Empire)
- Grand Cross of the Order of the Nichan Iftikhar (Ottoman Empire)
- Knight Grand Cross of the Order of the Bath (United Kingdom)

== See also ==
- Battle of Mecca 1916
- Sharifian Caliphate
- Siege of Medina
- Suleiman Mousa

al-Ḥusayn ibn 'Alī ibn Muḥammad ibn 'Abd al-Mu'īn ibn 'Awn House of Hashim; Dhawu Awn, branch of Banu Qatadah Born: 1854 Died: 4 June 1931
Regnal titles
New creation Arab Revolt	King of the Arab Lands; October 1916 – 3 October 1924; Recognized by the Allies only as King of Hejaz	Succeeded by Ali bin Hussein as King of Hejaz
Preceded by Himself as Ottoman emir	Sharif and Emir of Mecca; June 1916 – 3 October 1924	Succeeded by Ali bin Hussein
Political offices
Preceded by Abd al-Ilah Pasha	Sharif and Emir of Mecca; November 1908 – June 1916; Ottoman-appointed	Succeeded by Himself as independent emir
Preceded by Abd al-Ilah Pasha	Sharif and Emir of Mecca; November 1908 – June 1916; Ottoman-appointed	Succeeded by Ali Haidar Pasha
Sunni Islam titles
Preceded by Abdülmecid II	— TITULAR — Caliph of the Muslims; 11 March 1924 – 4 June 1931 (in exile since 19 December 1925); Reason for succession failure: Not widely recognized outside Middle-East; Haramayn invaded	Vacant
