= Muhammad ibn Abd al-Mu'in =

Sharif and Emir of Mecca (1767–1858)

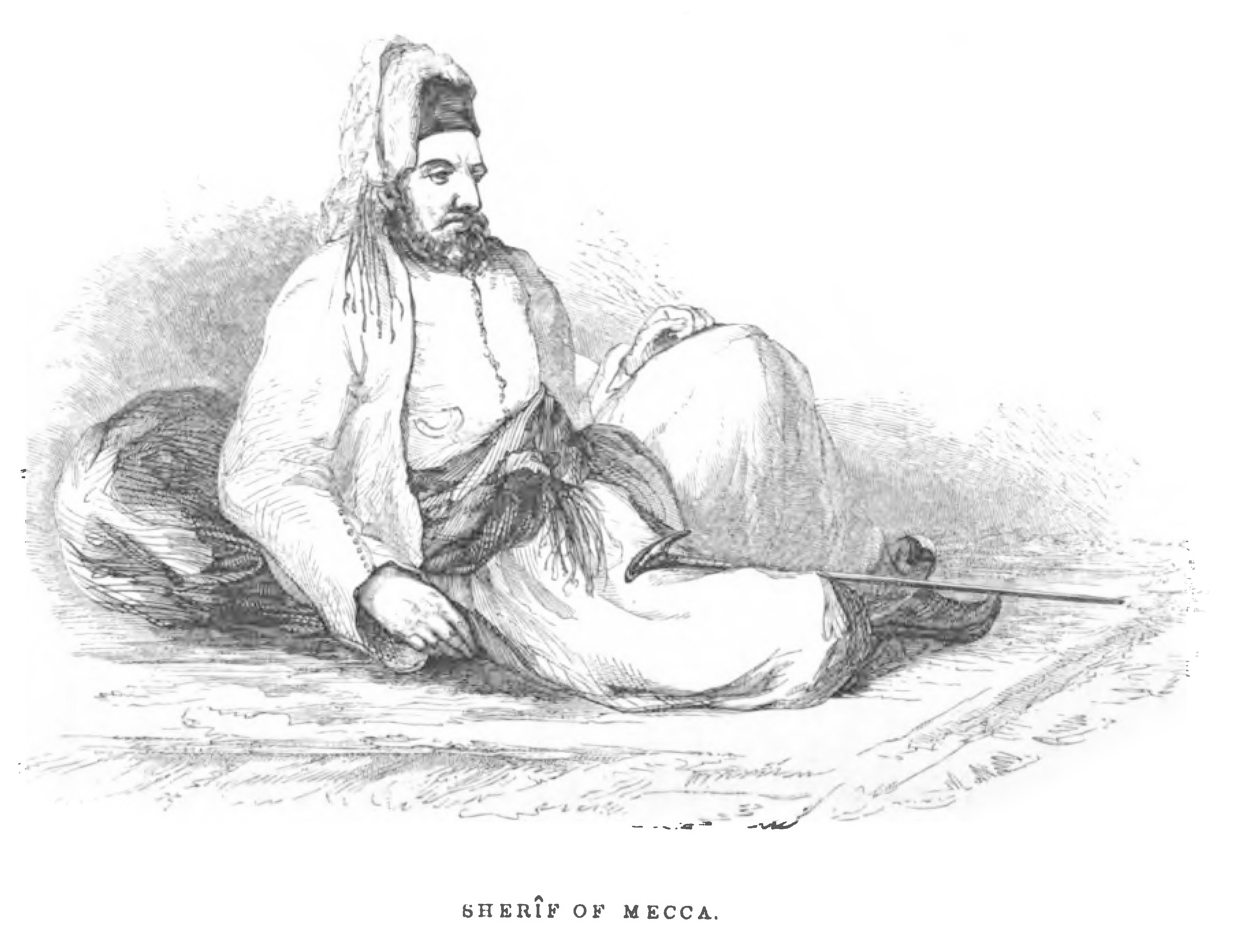
- Muhammed bin Abd al-Muin, Sharif of Mecca 1827–1851, as pictured in the 1848 book by William Francis Lynch.

Sharif and Emir of Mecca
- First reign: 1827–1851
- Predecessor: Abd al-Muttalib ibn Ghalib
- Successor: Abd al-Muttalib ibn Ghalib
- Second reign: 1856–1858
- Predecessor: Abd al-Muttalib ibn Ghalib
- Successor: Abd Allah Pasha ibn Muhammad
- Born: 1767
- Died: 29 March 1858 (aged 90–91)
- Issue: Abdullah; Ali; Husayn; Awn ar-Rafiq; Sultan; Abd al-Ilah; Four daughters

Muḥammad ibn 'Abd al-Mu'īn ibn 'Awn (Arabic: محمد بن عبد المعين بن عون; 1767 – c. 29 March 1858), also known as Muhammad ibn Awn (محمد ابن عون), was Sharif and Emir of Mecca from 1827 to 1851 and 1856 to 1858. Through his grandson Hussein ibn Ali, he is the ancestor of the Hashemite dynasty of the modern Kingdom of Jordan.

== Family ==
He was the son of Sharif 'Abdu'l Muin bin 'Aun.

== Emirate ==
He was appointed to the Emirate in 1827 by Muhammad Ali Pasha, the Ottoman ruler of Egypt. He was the first Emir of Mecca from the Abdillahis – the clan descending from his 6th generation ancestor Abd Allah ibn Hasan.

== Death and burial ==
He died on 13 Sha'ban 1274 AH (c. 29 March 1858) after an illness. He was buried in the qubbah (tomb-building) of Aminah bint Wahb, the mother of the Islamic prophet Muhammad, next to her grave.

== Issue ==
He had six sons:

1. Abdullah
2. Ali (father of Hussein bin Ali, Sharif of Mecca)
3. Husayn
4. Awn ar-Rafiq
5. Sultan
6. Abd al-Ilah

He also had four daughters.
