= Baba Zünnun Rebellion =

- Part of List of rebellions in the Ottoman Empire
Date	1526
Location	Anatolia
Result	Revolt suppressed

Belligerents
Ottoman Empire	Followers of Baba Zünnun

Commanders and leaders
(Ottoman Empire) Piri Beg (Ottoman Empire) Hürrem Pasha † (Ottoman Empire) Hüseyin Pasha † (Ottoman Empire) Ali Beg † (Ottoman Empire) Berham Beg † (Ottoman Empire) Deli Husrev Pasha	Baba Zünnun †

Baba Zünnun was an Alevi who struck the palace of Lord Mustafa of the sandjak of Bozok in August, 1526 and revolted with his troops. After this he encountered troops who were sent to crush the revolt, but Baba Zünnun won. Hürrem Paşa, Berham Bey of the sanjak of Kayseri and Ali bey of the sanjak of İçel died during this battle. Finally, the Sanjakbey of Adana, Piri Bey, and the Beylerbey of Sivas, Hüseyin Pasha, who took action with the reinforcements sent from the center, crushed the rebels at a place called Hunbeli on September 26, 1526. Baba Zünnun was killed on the battlefield, and a group of his supporters fled to the mountains. At night, these supporters attacked the Ottoman army, which was trying to regroup, and seriously wounded Hüseyin Pasha. Hüseyin Pasha was carried off to Sivas, where he died. However, three days later, the Beylerbey of Diyarbakir, Deli Husrev Pasha, who was sent to the region, put all the captured Qizilbash rebels to the sword, and thus the rebellion ended.
