= Abd al-Muttalib ibn Ghalib =

Emir and Grand Sharif of Mecca

Abd al-Mutalib ibn Ghalib ibn Musa‘ad (Arabic: عبد المطلب بن غالب بن مساعد, romanized: ‘Abd al-Muṭṭalib ibn Ghālib ibn Musā‘ad; 1790 — 29 January 1886) served three times as Emir and Grand Sharif of Mecca: First in 1827, then 1851 to 1856, and finally 1880 to 1881.

His rule after replacing Muhammad ibn Awn in 1851 was characterized by pro-slavery and anti-Ottoman riots. He was pro-slavery and led riots, in this contest he struggled with Vali Kâmil Pasha's enforcement of anti-slavery law and Awn's supporters. On 15 or 17 November 1855, Awn's reappointment was announced in Jeddah; al-Muttalib rejected this, raising his supporters and allegedly requesting Beduin chiefs assist him. Awn was reinstalled on 17 April 1856, but the fighting continued until al-Muttalib was captured in May and sent to Constantinople. When he returned to power in 1880, he did not oppose English and Ottoman anti-slavery due, as suggested by William Ochsenwald, to his reliance on the central government for his competition with Vali Osman Nuri Pasha.

== See also ==
- Ottoman Arabia
- Sharifate of Mecca

‘Abd al-Muṭṭalib ibn Ghālib ibn Musā‘ad ibn Sa‘īd ibn Sa‘d ibn Zayd House of Zayd Cadet branch of the House of Qatādah Born: 1790 Died: 29 January 1886
Political offices
Preceded by Yahya ibn Surur	Emir and Grand Sharif of Mecca; August 1827 – September 1827	Succeeded by Muhammad ibn Abd al-Muin
Preceded by Muhammad ibn Abd al-Muin	Emir and Grand Sharif of Mecca; July 1851 – 6 January 1856	Succeeded by Muhammad ibn Abd al-Muin
Preceded by Husayn ibn Muhammad	Emir and Grand Sharif of Mecca; June 1880 – 31 August 1881	Succeeded by Abd al-Ilah Pasha
