= Abdul Qadir =

- Gender: Male
- Language: Arabic

Origin
- Meaning: Servant of (the Powerful) Allah

Abd al-Qadir or Abdulkadir (Arabic: عبد القادر) is a male Muslim given name. It is formed from the Arabic words Abd, al- and Qadir. The name means 'servant of who can do everything'. Al-Qādir is one of the names of Allah in the Qur'an, which give rise to the Muslim theophoric names.

The letter a of the al- is unstressed, and can be transliterated by almost any vowel, often by u. So the first part can appear as Abdel, Abdul or Abdal. The second part can be transliterated Qader, Kadir, Qadir, Kader, Gadir or in other ways, and the whole name subject to variable spacing and hyphenation.

There is a related but much less common name, Abdul Qadeer (Arabic: عبد القدیر), with a similar meaning. The two may become confused when transliterated, and a few of the names below may be instances of the latter name.

Notable people with the name include:

== Men ==
=== In sport ===
==== Athletics ====
- Abdelkader Zaddem (born 1944), Tunisian runner
- Abdelkader El Mouaziz (born 1969), Moroccan runner
- Abdelkader Hachlaf (born 1979), Moroccan runner
- Abdalla Abdelgadir (born 1988), Sudanese runner

==== Cricket ====
- Abdul Kadir (cricketer) (1944–2002), Pakistani cricketer
- Abdul Qadir (cricketer) (1955–2019), Pakistani cricketer
- Abdul Kadeer Ali (born 1983), English cricketer
- Abdul Cader (cricketer) (born 1995), Sri Lankan cricketer

==== Football ====
- Abdelkader Ben Bouali (1912–1997) French footballer
- Abdul Kadir (Indonesian footballer) (1948–2003), Indonesian footballer
- Abdulqadir Hassan (born 1962), Emirati footballer
- Abdelkader El Brazi (1964–2014), Moroccan footballer
- Abdelkader Ferhaoui (born 1965), Algerian footballer
- Azizon Abdul Kadir (born 1980), Malaysian footballer
- Abdul Kader Keïta (born 1981), Ivorian footballer
- Abdelkader Laïfaoui (born 1981), Algerian footballer
- Abdoul Kader Camara (born 1982), Guinean footballer
- Abdelkader Besseghir (born 1978), Algerian footballer
- Brahim Abdelkader Díaz, otherwise Brahim Díaz (born 1999), Moroccan footballer
- Mohamed Abdel-Kader Coubadja-Touré, otherwise Mohamed Kader (born 1979), Togolese footballer
- Abdou Kader Mangane (born 1983), Senegalese footballer
- Abdelkader Ghezzal (born 1984), French-Algerian footballer
- Abdulkader Dakka (born 1985), Syrian footballer
- Abdulkadir Özgen (born 1986), Turkish-German footballer
- Abdelkader Kraichi (born 1989), French footballer
- Abdel Kader Rifai (born 1973), Syrian footballer
- Abdülkadir Kayalı (born 1991), Turkish footballer
- Abdukodir Khusanov (born 2004), Uzbek footballer
- Anwar Abdalqader (born 1953), Syrian football manager

==== Martial arts ====
- Syed Abdul Kadir (born 1948), Singapore boxer
- Abdülkadir Koçak (born 1981), Turkish boxer
- Abdelkader Zrouri (born 1976), Moroccan Taekwondo athlete
- Abdelkader Bouhenia (born 1986), French boxer
- Abdulqader Hikmat (born 1987), Qatari Taekwondo practitioner
- Abdelkader Chadi (born 1988), Algerian boxer

==== Other sports ====
- Omer Abdelqader (born 1983), Qatari basketball player
- Hisham Abdulqader Abdulla (born 1976), Bahraini volleyball player
- Abdel Kader Sylla (born 1990), Seychelles basketball player
- Justin Abdelkader (born 1987), American ice-hockey player

=== Writers ===
- Abd al-Qadir Maraghi (died 1435), Persian poet, musician and artist
- Abd al-Qadir al-Fasi (1599–1680), Moroccan writer
- Abdelkader Benali (born 1975), Moroccan-Dutch writer and journalist
- Abdul-Qādir Bēdil (1642–1720), Indian-Persian poet and Sufi
- Abdullah bin Abdul Kadir (1796–1854), Malayan writer
- Ibrahim Abdel-Kader el-Mazni (1890–1949), Egyptian novelist, short story writer, essayist, translator, and poet
- Abdul Kadir (1917–1985), Turkish poet
- Abdul Quadir (1906–1984), Bangladeshi poet
- `Abd al-Qadir Bada'uni (1540–1615), Indo-Persian historian and translator
- Abdelkader Alloula (1929–1994), Algerian playwright

=== In the arts ===
- Abdul Qader Al Raes (born 1951), UAE artist
- Abdulkadir Ahmed Said (born 1953), Somali film director, producer, screenwriter, cinematographer and editor
- Abdelkader Moutaa (1940–2025), Moroccan actor
- Abd El Gadir Salim (1946–2025), Sudanese folk-singer
- Abdul Qadir Al Rassam (1882–1952), Iraqi painter
- Kozhikode Abdul Kader (1916–1977), Indian playback singer

=== Politicians and secular leaders ===
==== From Africa ====
- Sultan Abdiqadir Sultan Abdillahi (died 1975), seventh Grand Sultan of the Isaaq Sultanate
- Abd al-Qadir II, ruler of the Kingdom of Sennar (Sudan)
- Emir Abdelkader al-Jazairi (1808–1883), Algerian religious and military leader
- Abd al-Qadir (Sokoto), Sokoto (Nigeria) Grand Vizier
- Abdul Qadir al-Badri (1921–2003), Libyan politician
- Abdulkadir Balarabe Musa (1936–2020), Nigerian politician
- Abdelkader Bengrina (born 1962), Algerian politician
- Abdulkadir Abdi Hashi, Somali politician
- Abdoulkader Cissé (born 1955), Burkinabe politician
- Abdelkader Hachani (1956–1999), Algerian Islamist politician
- Abdulqadir al-Baghdadi (1952–2011), Libyan diplomat
- Abdelkader Taleb Omar (born 1952), Sahrawi politician
- Abdelkader Lecheheb (1954–2024), Moroccan diplomat
- Abdulkadir Kure (1956–2017), Nigerian politician
- Inuwa Abdulkadir (1966–2020), Nigerian politician
- Mohamed Abdoulkader Mohamed (born 1951), Djiboutian politician
- Wadel Abdelkader Kamougué (1939–2011), Chadian politician

==== From the Middle East ====
- Abdul Qader al-Keilani (1874–1948), Syrian nationalist, statesman and religious authority
- Faisal Abdel Qader Al-Husseini, otherwise Faisal Husseini (1940–2001), Palestinian politician
- Abdülkadir Aksu (born 1944), Turkish politician
- Abdul Qadir Bajamal (1946–2020), Yemeni politician
- Abd al-Qadir Qaddura (1935–2013), Syrian politician
- Abdul Qadir Obeidi (born 1947), Iraqi politician

==== From Southeast Asia and the Subcontinent ====
- Zambry Abdul Kadir (born 1962), Malaysian politician
- Abdul Kadir Yusuf (1915–1992), Malaysian politician
- Abdul Aziz Abdul Kadir (born 1963), Malaysian politician
- Abdul Cader Shahul Hameed (1928–1999), Sri Lankan diplomat and political figure
- A.R.M. Abdul Cader (1936–2015), Sri Lankan politician and businessman
- Abdul Kader Mia (died 1960), Bengali politician
- Abdul Qadir Baloch (born 1945), Pakistani politician and retired military general
- Abdul Qadir (jurist) (1872–1950), leader of Muslims during the British Raj
- Abdul Qadir Patel (born 1968), Pakistani politician
- Md. Abdul Kadir, Bangladeshi politician

==== From Central Asia ====
- Abdul Qadir Alam, Afghan politician
- Abdul Qadir Imami Ghori (born 1954), Afghan politician
- Abdul Qadir Nuristani (1936–1978), Afghan policeman and Minister of Interior during the Republic of Afghanistan

==== From the Americas ====
- Abdul Kadir (politician) (1952–2018), Guyanese politician and conspirator in a planned attack of JFK Airport

==== From Europe ====
- Abdelkader Lahmar (born 1971), French politician

=== In religion ===
- Abdul-Qadir Gilani (1077–1166), Persian Sufi saint
- Abd al-Qadir ibn Shaqrun (died 1801 or 1804), Moroccan religious scholar
- Sheikh Abdulkadir Nur Farah (1940–2013), Somali Cleric was assassinated by Al-Shabab 2013
- Abdelkader El Djezairi (1808–1883), commonly known as Emir Abdelkader, Algerian religious and military leader
- Abdul Qader Arnaoot (1928–2004), Albanian-Syrian Islamic scholar
- Abdalqadir as-Sufi (1930–2021), Scottish Sufi
- Sheikh Syed Abdul Qadir Jilani (1935–2025), Pakistani Sunni scholar and jurist
- Abdolqader Zahedi (1907–2005), Kurdish-Iranian Sunni religious teacher and politician
- Abdul Kader (almami) (c. 1726 – 1806), Torodbe Marabout who founded the Imamate of Futa Toro in what is now northern Senegal

=== Military figures and activists ===
- Abdelkader Perez, Moroccan Admiral and ambassador to England
- Abd al-Qadir al-Husayni (1907–1948), Palestinian Arab nationalist and fighter
- Abdulkadir Yahya Ali (1957–2005), Somali peace activist
- Abdelkader Guerroudj (1928–2020), Algerian communist active in the liberation war
- Abdul Qadeer Baloch (1940–2025), Pakistani human rights activist
- Abdul Qadir (1944–2014), Afghan military officer during the Saur Revolution and Minister of Defense during the Democratic Republic of Afghanistan (DRA)
- Abdul Qadir (Afghan leader) (1951–2002), military leader of the Northern Alliance in Afghanistan
- Abdelkader Belliraj (born 1957), Moroccan-Belgian found guilty of terrorist offences
- Abdelkader Mokhtari (died 2015), Algerian commander active in the Bosnian war
- Abdulkadir Shehu, Nigerian military/politician

=== Detainees ===
- Abd Al Nasir Mohammed Abd Al Qadir Khantumani (born 1960), Syrian held in Guantanamo
- Mohammed Abd Al Al Qadir (born 1976), Algerian held in Guantanamo
- Abdullah Abdulqadirakhun (born 1979), Uyghur held in Guantanamo
- Idris Ahmed Abdu Qader Idris (born 1979), Yemeni held in Guantanamo
- Ahmed Abdul Qader (born 1984), Yemeni held in Guantanamo
- Abdulkadir Masharipov (born 1988), Uzbek held in Turkey for committing the Istanbul nightclub shooting

=== Other ===
- Abdul Qadeer Khan (1936–2021), Pakistani nuclear scientist
- Abdulkadir Ahmed (1940–1997), Nigerian banker
- Abdulqadir Opeyemi Abdulsalam, Nigerian banker
- Abdul Qadir (banker) (1903–??), Pakistani banker
- Abdul Kader Kamli, Arab IT expert
- Mustafa Abdulkader Aabed al-Ansari, otherwise Mustafa al-Ansari (died 2004), Saudi wanted by the FBI
- Abdi Wali Abdulqadir Muse, probable correct name of Abduwali Abdukhadir Muse (born 1992), Somali imprisoned for piracy

== Women ==
- Zainab Abdulkadir Kure (born 1959), Nigerian politician
- Hind Ben Abdelkader (born 1995), Belgian basketball player
