= Tirhandil =

The Tirhandil is the oldest style of vessel on the Aegean Sea. Tirhandils are rarer these days due to their accommodation capacity. Double-ended traditional design allows for only a small number of cabins. Tirhandils sail well and are an attractive vessel with plenty of deck space.

Tirhandil carries the most traditional elements of Aegean sailing boats of the last two millenniums. It takes its origins from the Bodrum area, has one or two masts, a bowsprit and lateen sails. It is beak-nosed with a scoop stern and simple interior capacity.

Tirhandils have been the workhorses of the Mediterranean for the last two thousand years and is similar to its cousin, the caique, and the Greek transport vessel called perama. The Greek equivalent of tirhandil is trechenderi.

== See also ==
- Marinas in Turkey
- Tourism in Turkey
- Blue Cruise
- Gulet
