= Erhat =

Erhat is a Turkish surname. It may refer to:

- Azra Erhat (1915–1982), Turkish author, archaeologist, academician, classical philologist, translator and a pioneer of Turkish Humanism
- Erhat Toka, a German Muslim Salafist, board member of the Muslimisch Demokratischen Union (MDU) and Bündnis für Innovation und Gerechtigkeit (BIG)

== See also ==
- Erhatvan or Hotoan, one of the six villages of Căuaș, a commune in Satu Mare County, Romania
