= Embassy of Libya, London =

Embassy of Libya in London
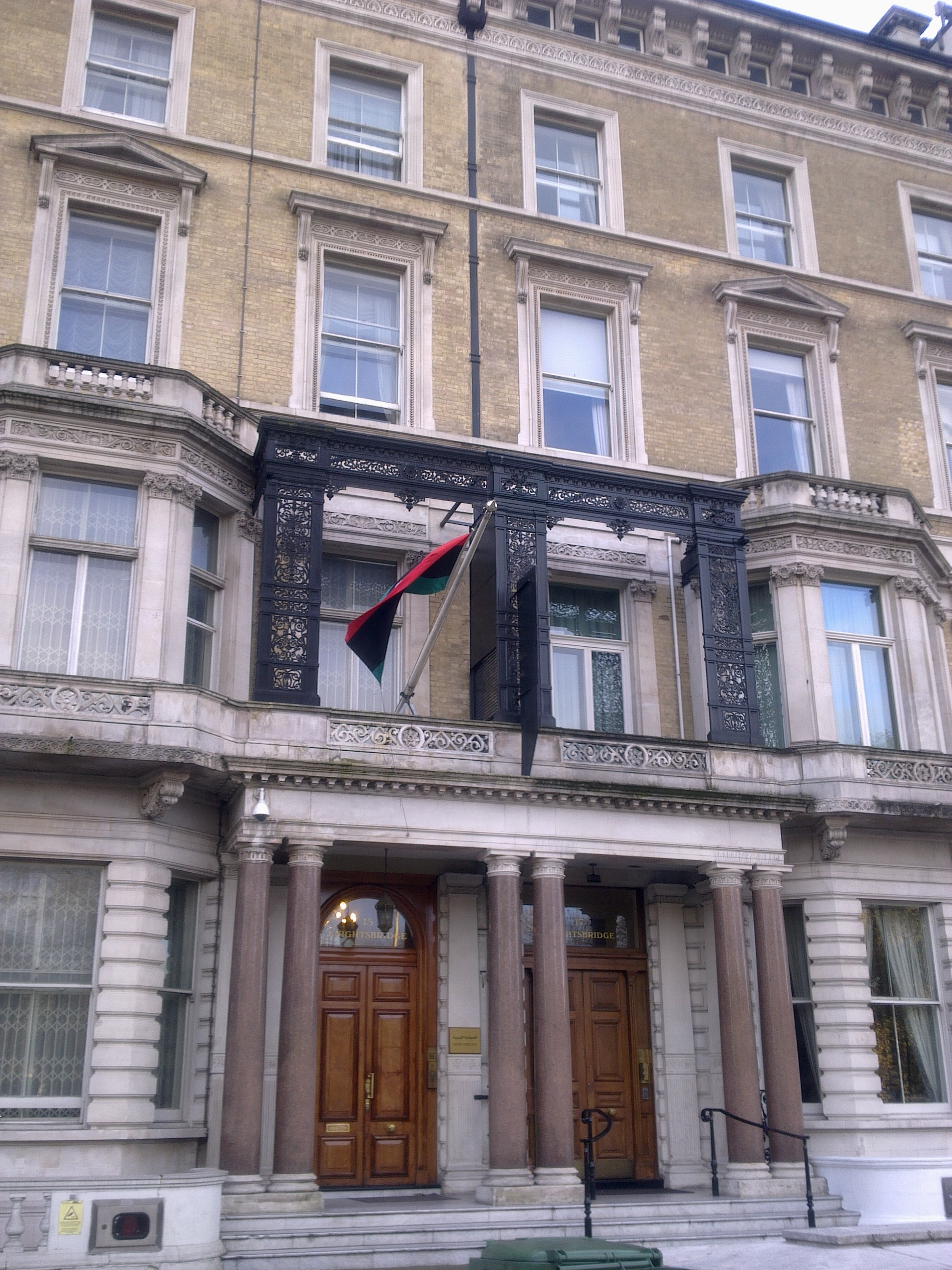
- Location: Knightsbridge, London
- Address: 15 Knightsbridge, London, SW1X 7LY
- Coordinates: 51°30′8.4″N 0°9′14.4″W
- Ambassador: Chargé d’Affairs, Mr Khaled Jweda

The Embassy of Libya in London is the diplomatic mission of Libya in the United Kingdom. Libya also maintains a Consular & Cultural Affairs Section at 61-62 Ennismore Gardens, Knightsbridge and a Medical Office at 22 Red Lion Street, Bloomsbury.

== History ==
The former embassy which was named as Libyan People's Bureau was formerly located in the St James's district and was frequently targeted by protesters opposed to the rule of Muammar Gaddafi. On 17 April 1984, shots were fired from the embassy towards protesters on St James's Square, injuring ten and killing a British police officer, Yvonne Fletcher. With the subsequent siege of the embassy by armed police and expelling of those inside, diplomatic relations with Libya were broken off and were not resumed until 1999, whereupon the embassy was moved to its current location in Knightsbridge.

The embassy was again the focus of attention in 2011 during the Libyan Civil War. There were several protests in the early part of the year against the Gaddafi government's crackdown on protesters in Benghazi, culminating in the occupation of the embassy's roof and the swapping of the flag with that of the National Transitional Council (now the current Libyan flag). In July of that year the British government expelled the existing embassy staff and formally recognised the NTC as the sole legitimate authority in Libya.

== Gallery ==
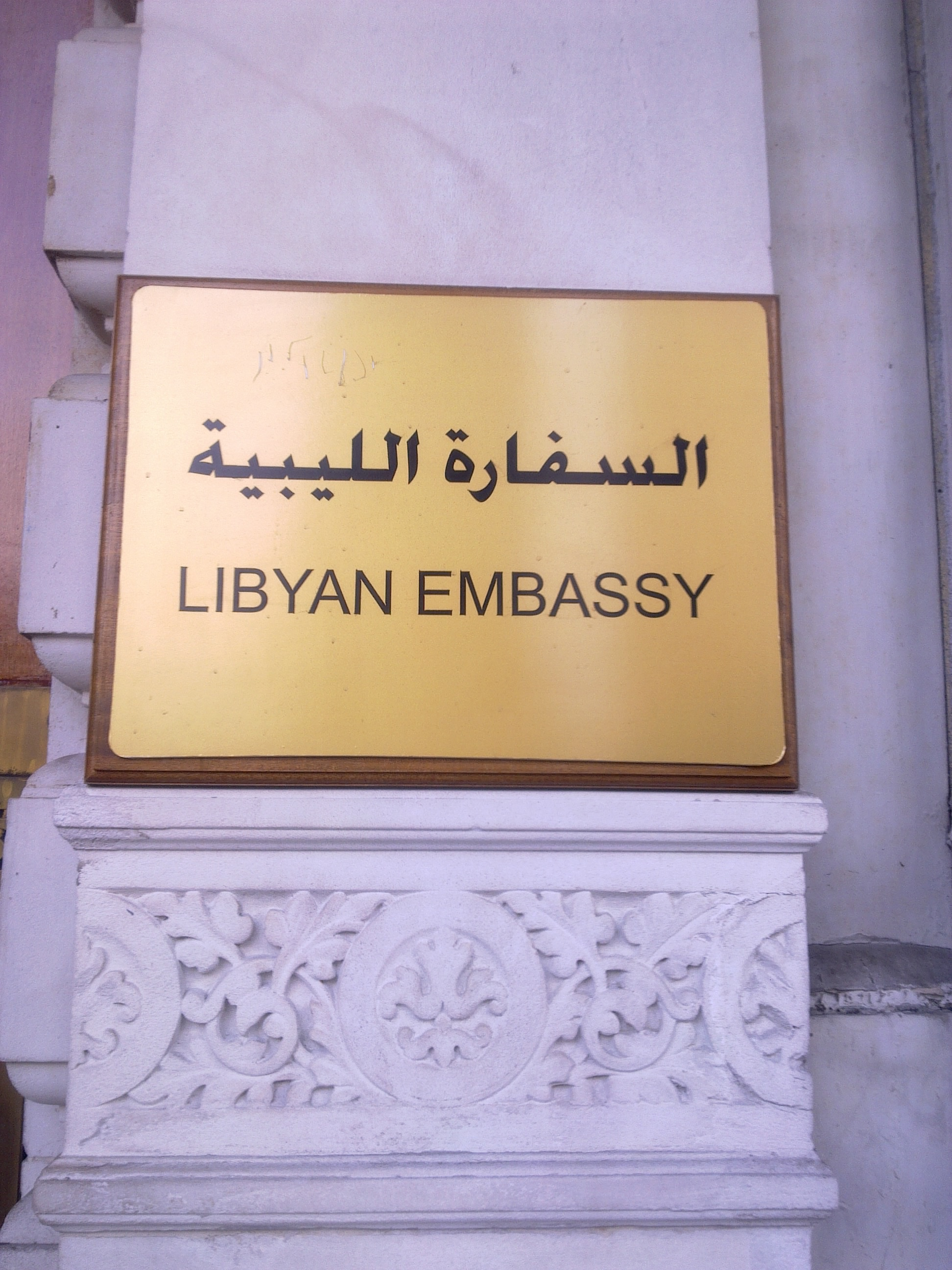
Plaque outside the embassy

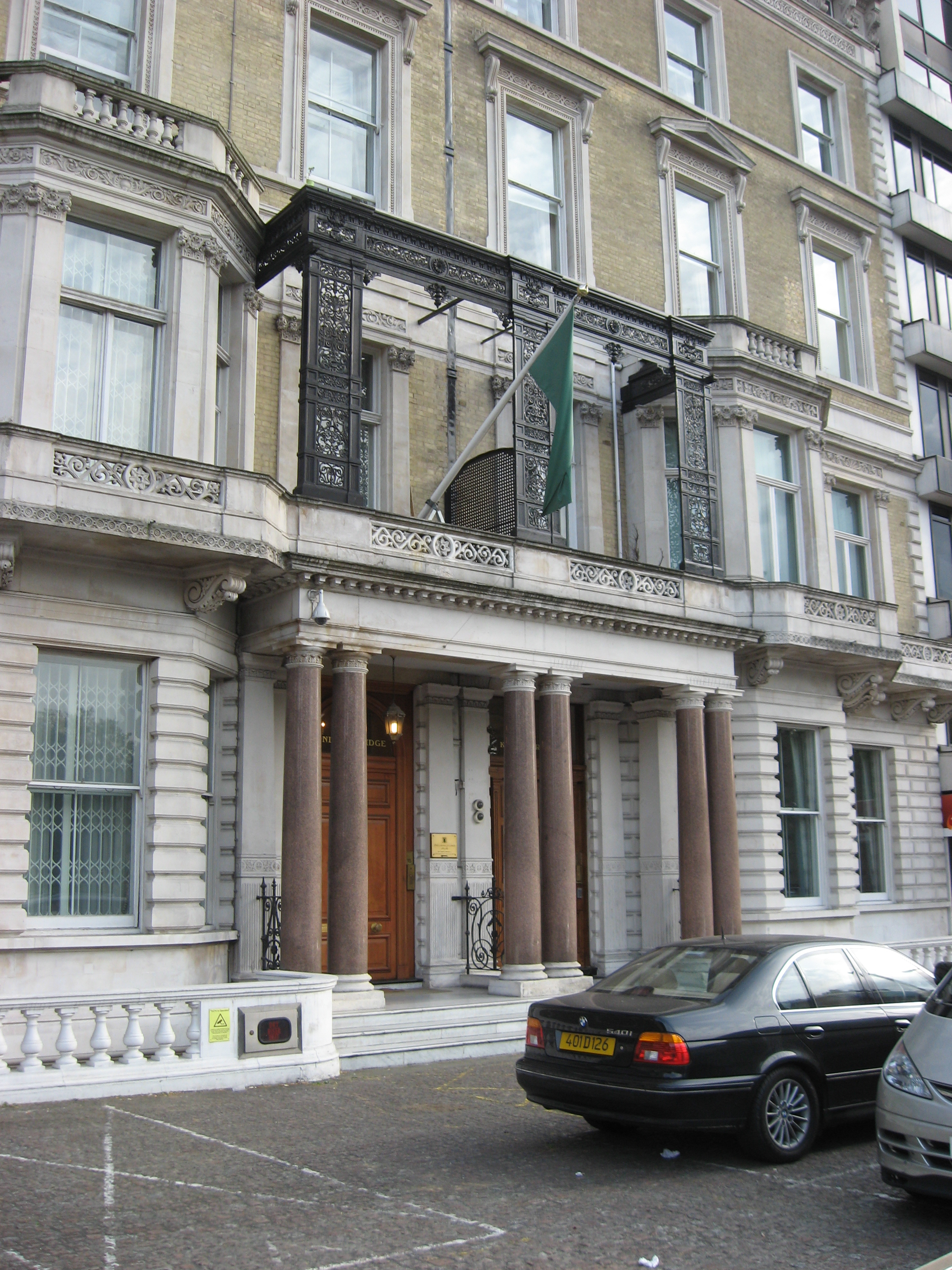
The embassy in 2008, prior to the overthrow of Muammar Gaddafi

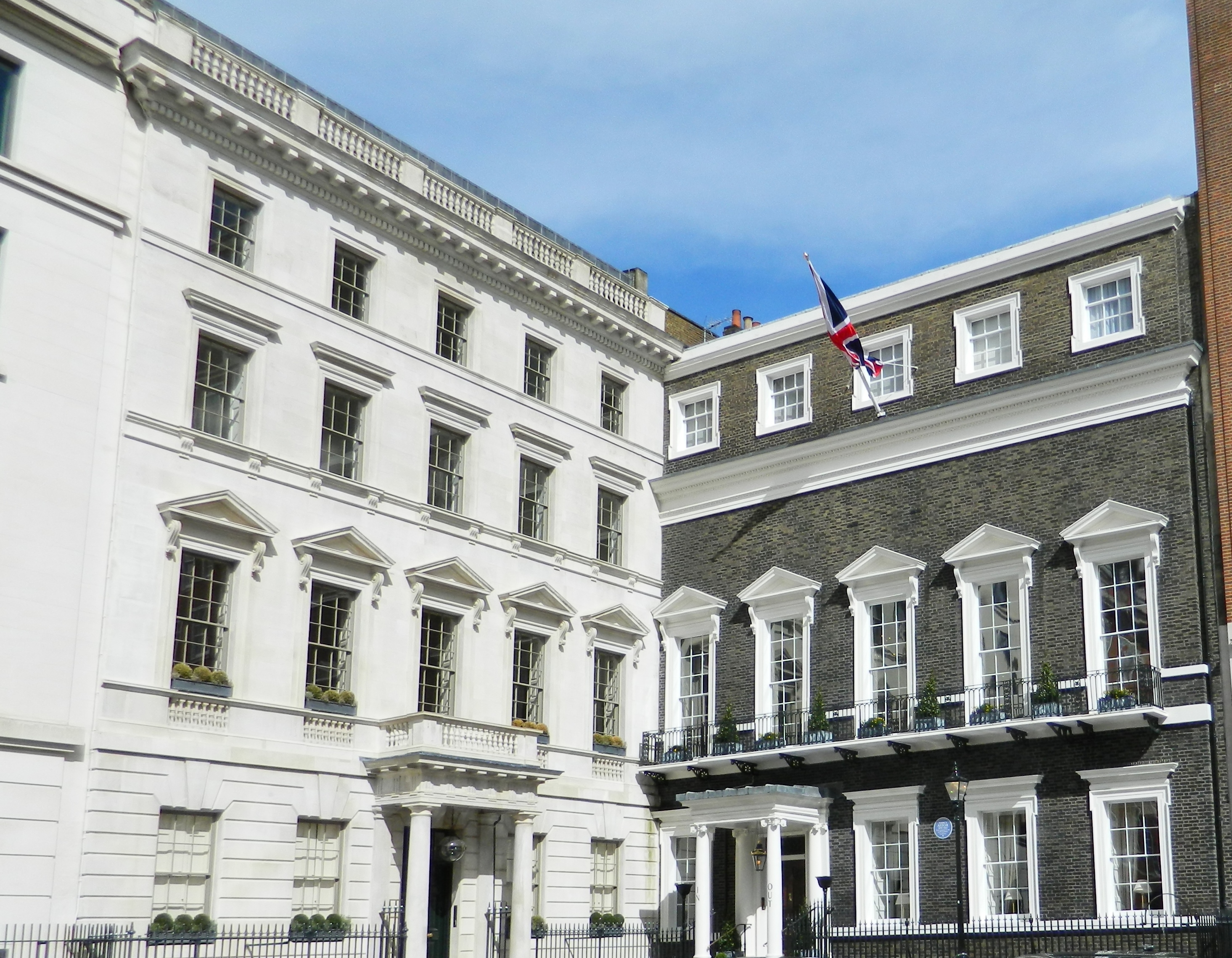
The former Libyan Embassy (left) in St James's Square which was known as the Libyan People's Bureau

== Notable workers ==
- Omar Ahmed Sodani

== See also ==
- Murder of Yvonne Fletcher
