= Azra Erhat =

Turkish translator and author (1915–1982)

- Born: 4 June 1915; Şişli, Istanbul, Ottoman Empire
- Died: 6 September 1982 (aged 67); Istanbul, Turkey
- Education: Lycée Émile Jacqmain
- Alma mater: Ankara University
- Occupations: Author; archaeologist; academic; classical philologist; translator
- Known for: Introducing Turkish society to the Classics in the native Turkish language; one of 3 Turkish companions who together coined the popular term Blue Cruise (Turkish: Mavi Yolculuk)
- Notable work: Turkish translations of Homer's Iliad and Odyssey in collaboration with A.Kadir; Turkish translations of Hesiod's Theogony and Works and Days as well as works of Sophocles, Aristophanes, Plato, and Sappho
- Awards: Habib Törehan Science Award (1959) with A.Kadir for Homer's Iliad Translation Volume 1; Turkish Language Association Translation Award (1961) Homer's Iliad Translation Volume 3

Azra Erhat (4 June 1915 – 6 September 1982) was a Turkish author, archaeologist, academic, classical philologist, and translator. A pioneer of Turkish Humanism, Azra Erhat is especially well known for her published works, including many translations into Turkish from the classical literature of Ancient Greece.

== Biography ==
Azra Erhat was born on 4 June 1915 in Şişli, Istanbul. Her parents were Tevfik Bey and Nasibe Hanım. Nakibe and her sister, Mukbile, were the children of Fatma Hanım and Fadıl Bey. Fadıl Bey (1857-1938) was born in Salonica (modern-day Thessaloniki), today in Greece, where she completed his primary and secondary education before traveling to Istanbul, where he graduated from law school. Working as a lawyer while splitting his time between Istanbul and Salonica, Fadıl and his wife, Fatma, eventually settled down in Büyükada Island, Istanbul Province, in 1923.

The period of Azra Erhat’s birth was a time of upheaval, coinciding with the occupation of Constantinople by British, French, and Italian forces. She moved with her parents to İzmir in 1922 and to Vienna, Austria in 1924, when her father's work was transferred there. Erhat received two years of primary education in Volksschule, Vienna, before her father's work necessitated another move, this time to Brussels, Belgium. There she completed primary school and then attended Emile Jacqmain High School (fr) where she gained a strong interest in literature while studying French, Flemish, Latin, and Ancient Greek. When Erhat's father died in 1932, Azra stayed in Brussels at a friend's home to complete high school while her family moved back to Istanbul. Finishing with the highest achievement level (French: avec le plus grand fruit bel), she then rejoined her family in Istanbul. In 1934 Azra entered the Istanbul University Faculty of Arts degree, where her most influential instructor was the Austrian romance philologist and prolific literary critic, Leo Spitzer. Introducing Erhat to Professor George Rodhe of Ankara University in 1936, Spitzer recommended Azra for a student-assistant position translating Rodhe's lessons from French, German, Latin, and Greek content into Turkish. On September 1, 1936, Erhat accepted the offer and transferred to the newly inaugurated Department of Classical Philology of the Faculty of Languages, History, and Geography at Ankara University. Working as a student-translator-assistant up to and beyond graduation in 1939, she continued as an assistant in the University's Department of Classical Philology and became an associate professor in 1946. During this same period, Azra also worked in the Translation Office established by Minister of Education Hasan Ali Yücel with fellow Turkish Humanism pioneers Sabahattin Eyüboğlu, Vedat Günyol (tr), Orhan Burian (tr), and Saffet Korkut, establishing close friendships with them. In 1945, separately and together with Orhan Veli, she translated and published many works from Homer, Aristophanes, Sophocles, and Plato.

With the departure of Hasan Ali Yücel as Turkey’s minister of education following the 1946 elections, the political atmosphere began changing in the Department of Education. In 1948, during a cleansing of left-leaning thinkers, Erhat and fellow faculty members, including Pertev Naili Boratav, Behice Boran, Adnan Cemgil (tr), and Niyazi Berkes, were dismissed from Ankara University. Returning to Istanbul, Erhat continued working from 1949 to 1955 as a translator, an art critic, and news reporter, when she received a position with the Turkish daily newspaper, Vatan, where she worked until 1956. From 1956 until her retirement in 1975, Erhat worked in the library of the United Nations' International Labour Organization (ILO) Near and Middle East Center. In 1971, Erhat, Sabahattin Eyüboğlu, and Vedat Günyol were arrested and charged with violating Article 141 of the Turkish Criminal Code (establishing a secret communist organization) during the coup d’etat of March 12 1971 Turkish military memorandum. Detained for 4 months in the Maltepe Military Prison, Erhat and her companions were released in the first legal session. While she was unable to work throughout the one and a half years until her lawsuit was finally closed, the ILO supported Erhat and protected her staff.

The years between 1956 and 1982 are considered Erhat's most prominent period, with the publication of many literary works during this time. Individual works and others she collaborated on with Sabahattin Eyüboğlu were published in New Horizons Magazine (Turkish: Yeni Ufuklar). In collaboration with Ibrahim Abdulkadir Mericboyu, alias/pen-name A. Kadir, Erhat translated Homer's Iliad, winning the Habib Törehan Science Award in 1959 for Volume 1, and the Turkish Language Association Translation Award in 1961 for Volume 3. Erhat's translation of Homer's Odyssey was published in 1970, her Dictionary of Mythology (Turkish: Mitoloji Sözlüğü) was published in 1972, and her Ph.D. thesis provided the material published in collaboration with Cengiz Bektaş in 1978 entitled, Conversations and Poetry on Sappho (Turkish: Sappho Üzerine Konuşmalar ve Şiir Çevirileri). Azra Erhat also occasionally wrote under the pseudonym Ayşe Nur.

On September 6, 1982, after unsuccessful treatment in London for cancer, Azra Erhat died in Istanbul at age 67. Her body was buried at the Bülbüldere Cemetery in Üsküdar, Istanbul.

Following Erhat’s death, her books were endowed to Anadolu University, with a collection created in her memory. In 1983, in honor of Erhat’s significant contribution to Classical Literature translations, Yazko a Turkish journal of translation, began offering a literary award in her name.

Erhat's Turkish translations of Homer’s Iliad and Odyssey remain influential in the study of classical literature in Turkey. Scholars have noted that her writing style focuses on accessibility for readers unable to access the original Greek texts. Her work is also recognized for integrating Anatolian cultural identity into the translation of Western epics.

In the Introduction to her İşte İnsan (Ecce Homo), Azra writes in Turkish:

Büyük tuttum bu işi: dört yıllık düşüncemi, yaşantımı bir kitaba sığdırmak isterdim. Homeros'ta insan dedim yola çıktım, beden ruh ikiliği dikildi karşıma, aldım inceledim; derken Platon'un insan anlayışı, toplum görüşü çeldi aklımı, onu da kavrayayım derken açıldım uçsuz bucaksız bir düşünce alanına. Özgürlük, mutluluk, insancılık... Sorunlar, saçları altın tellerle örülmüş öcüler gibi çekti sürükledi beni oradan oraya. (...) Bir desteğim vardı: Yaşantıya olan güvenim. İnsanı mı konu edindim: insan gibi yaşayayım kendimi vere vere, dolu dizgin, coşkunca yaşayayım ki insanı anlayayım, insanı söyleyebileyim. (...) Sevgiyi ahlak edindim kendime. İnsancılığı yalnız sevgide gördüm ve sevgiden bekledim, kitabımı satır satır yazdırsın bana. Yanılmadım da: Ecce Homo'yu bana sevgi yazdırdı.

(From the same webpage translated to English by Google Translate:) I've kept this great job: four years of thought, I want to fit my life in a book. In Homer, I went on the road, body soul duality was erected, and I looked at it; Plato's human understanding, society, the wisdom of my mind, I understand it, I opened up to an immense field of thought. Freedom, happiness, humanity ... Problems, hairs woven with gold wires attracted the dangers pulled me from there. (...) I had a support: I have confidence in life. I've made a human being: I live like a human, I want to live a full, full of enthusiasm, let me understand the human, I can say human. I saw humanity in love alone and waited for love, let me print my book in line by line. I wasn't mistaken: Ecce Homo wrote me with love.

== Origination of Turkey’s “Blue Cruise” Movement ==
Strongly connected with her activities as a writer and translator, Erhat’s recreational activities likewise significantly impacted the rising trend of Westernization in Kemal Atatürk’s newly-formed Republic of Turkey. Together with fellow authors Cevat Şakir Kabaağaçlı, alias/pen-name The Fisherman of Halicarnassus (Turkish: Halikarnas Balıkçısı), and Sabahattin Eyüboğlu, Azra Erhat is considered an originator of the literary and touristic term, Blue Cruise (Turkish: Mavi Yolculuk). Used in Turkey's tourism industry, the name Blue Cruise (or Blue Voyage) is the title of Erhat’s travelogue, Mavi Yolculuk, originally published in 1962 and republished in 2005.

Cevat Şakir Kabaağaçlı, sentenced in 1925 to a 3-year exile to Bodrum found this sleepy fishing village known in antiquity as Halicarnassus so charming that, long after his exile ended, he returned to settle down there. Convincing his closest friends and fellow members of the Turkish intelligentsia of the unspoiled beauties of the shoreline and rural environment of Bodrum, authors Sabahattin Eyüboğlu, Azra Erhat, and others soon joined Cevat, who had renamed himself Halikarnas Balıkçısı (the Fisherman of Halicarnassus). In the coming decades, the close friends would enjoy many long sailing trips together in the local sponge divers' sailing boats, called gulets. Finding herself immersed in a lush natural landscape seemingly unchanged since antiquity, Erhat viewed her surroundings as “the scenes of historical and mythological events.” Expressing her strong belief that Anatolia gave birth to Western civilization, Erhat charmed her companions (and soon her readers) with detailed discussions from Classical Literature on Halicarnassus, Troy, Pergamum, Ephesus, and other famous Anatolian sites of Ancient Greece.

Especially with the 1962 release of Erhat’s popular travel book, Mavi Yolculuk (Blue Cruise), and articles written by Erhat and her colleagues at New Horizons Magazine (Turkish: Yeni Ufuklar), the Turkish reading public began flocking to this region. Guidebooks were published in both Turkish and German and soon the Turquoise Coast became an international tourist destination that is still famous today for Blue Cruises.

Enduring until the end of their lives, the relationship between Azra Erhat and the Fisherman of Halicarnassus (Turkish: Halikarnas Balıkçısı) blossomed into a love story regularly nourished by Blue Cruises when they were together and thousands of letters written to each other when they were apart. After Halikarnas Balıkçısı died in 1972, with his prior permission, Erhat published a collection of his letters in her 1976 book, Letters of the Fisherman of Halicarnassus (Turkish: Mektuplarla Halikarnas Balıkçısı).

== Bibliography ==
Azra Erhat has written 104 works in 307 publications in 2 languages and 633 library holdings, according to WorldCat Identities. Among her more popular books, WorldCat notes, Mektuplarıyle Halikarnas Balıkçısı (Letters of the Halicarnassus Fisherman), has had “15 editions published between 1976 and 2002 in Turkish and held by 43 WorldCat member libraries worldwide,” and Mitoloji sözlüğü (English: Dictionary of Mythology), with “20 editions published between 1972 and 2011 in Turkish and ‘undetermined’ and held by 40 WorldCat member libraries worldwide.”

Year	Title	Coauthors	Publisher	Notes
1944	Sophocles’ Elektra (Ἠλέκτρα/Elektra)		Milli Eğitim Bakanlığı Yayınları	Translation
1954	A. Gabriel’s Türkiye Tarih ve Sanat Memleketi (Turkey’s Native History and Art)		Doğan Kardeş	Translation
1954	Colette’s Dişi Kedi (La Chatte/The cat)		Varlık Yayınları	Translation
1958	Aristophanes’ Hayatı, Sanatı, Eseri (Life, Art, Work)		Varlık Yayınları	Translation
1960	Mavi Anadolu (Blue Anatolia)		Bilgi Yayınevi	
1962	Mavi Yolculuk (Blue Voyage/Blue Cruise)		Çan yayınları	
1962	Mavi Yolculuk II (Blue Voyage/Blue Cruise II)	Faruk Kırkan (editor)	Çan yayınları	
1962	Homer’s İlyada (Ἰλιάς/The Iliad)	A. Kadir	Türkiye İş Bankası Kültür Yayınları	Translation
1965	Vercors’ İnsan ve İnsanlar (Human and Humans)	Sabahattin Eyuboğlu, Vedat Günyol	Çan yayınları	Translation
1966	Aristophanes’ Lysistrata (Λυσιστράτη/Lysistrata)	Sabahattin Eyuboğlu	Remzi Kitabevi	Translation
1968	Antoine de Saint-Exupéry’s Küçük Prens (Le Petit Prince: La planète des Globus)		Yankı Yayınları	Translation
1968	Yasunari Kawabata’s Bin Beyaz Turna / İzu Dansözü (千羽鶴 /Sembazuru)	Zeyyat Selimoğlu	Cem Yayınevi	Translation
1969	İşte İnsan - Ecce Homo (Here is Human)		Remzi Kitabevi	
1969	Vincent Van Gogh’s Theo’ya Mektuplar (Dear Theo: The Letters of Vincent Van Gogh)		Yankı Yayınları	Translation
1970	Homer’s Odysseia (Ὀδύσσεια/The Odyssey)	A. Kadir	Sander yayınları	Translation
1972	Mitoloji Sözlüğü (Dictionary of Mythology)		Remzi Kitabevi	
1972	Plato’s Şölen - Dostluk (Συμπόσιον/Symposium)	Sabahattin Eyuboğlu	Remzi Kitabevi	Translation
1973	François Rabelais’ Gargantua	Sabahattin Eyuboğlu, Vedat Günyol	Cem Yayınevi	Translation
1975	Aristophanes’ Eşekarıları, Kuşlar, Kömürcüler, Barış, Kadınlar Savaşı (The Wasps, The Birds, The Acharnians, Peace, Lysistrata)	Sabahattin Eyuboğlu	Hürriyet Yayınları	Translation
1976	Homeros - Gül ile Söyleşi (Homer - Interview with Rose)		Cem Yayınevi	
1976	Mektuplarıyla Halikarnas Balıkçısı (Letters of the Fisherman of Halicarnassus)		Çağdaş Yayınları	
1977	Hesiodos, Eserleri ve Kaynakları (Works and Resources)	Sabahattin Eyüboğlu	Türk Tarih Kurumu Basimevi	Translation
1977	Hesiod’s Theogonia - İşler ve Günler (Θεογονία - Ἔργα καὶ Ἡμέραι/Theogony - Works and Days)	Sabahattin Eyüboğlu	Türk Tarih Kurumu Basimevi	Translation
1977	Pir Sultan Abdal’s Pir Sultan Abdal (Sufi Poetry of Patriarch Sultan Abdal)	Sabahattin Eyüboğlu, Attila Özkırımlı, Asim Bezirci	Cem Yayınevi	Translation
1978	Sappho - Üzerine Konuşmalar ve Şiir Çevirileri (Conversations and Poetry on Sappho)	Cengiz Bektaş	Cem Yayınevi	Translation
1978	Sevgi Yönetimi (Love Management)		Çaǧdaş Yayınları	
1979	Karya'dan Pamfilya'ya Mavi Yolculuk (Blue Cruise from Karya to Pamphylia)		Cem Yayınevi	
1981	Halikarnas Balıkçısı: Düşün Yazıları (Halicarnassus Fisherman: Thought Articles)	Halikarnas Balıkçısı	Bilgi Yayınevi	
1981	Troya Masalları (Troy Tales)		Cem Yayınevi	
1991	Colette’s Cicim (Chéri)		Can Yayinlari	Translation
1991	Hesiodos, Eserleri ve Kaynakları (Works and Resources)	Sabahattin Eyüboğlu	Türk Tarih Kurumu Basimevi	ISBN 9789751603395
1993	Pir Sultan Abdal’s Pir Sultan Abdal (Sufi Poetry of Patriarch Sultan Abdal)	Sabahattin Eyüboğlu, Attila Özkırımlı, Asim Bezirci	Cem Yayınevi	ISBN 9789754060362
1994	Vercors’ İnsan ve İnsanlar (Human and Humans)	Sabahattin Eyuboğlu, Vedat Günyol	Toplumsal Dönüşüm Yayınları	ISBN 9789757244059
1996	Gulleyla'ya Anilar: En hakiki mürşit (Gulleyla Memories: The Most Genuine Artist)		Cem Yayınevi	
1996	İşte İnsan - Ecce Homo (Here is Human)		Adam Yayınları	ISBN 9789750702655
1999	Antoine de Saint-Exupéry’s Savaş Uçuşu (Courrier sud/South Courier)		İnkılâp Kitabevi	ISBN 9789751013040
1999	Homeros - Gül ile Söyleşi		İş Bankası Kültür Yayınları	
1999	Sappho - Üzerine Konuşmalar ve Şiir Çevirileri (Conversations and Poetry on Sappho)	Cengiz Bektaş	Cumhuriyet Gazetesi	Translation
2000	Aristophanes’ Lysistrata (Λυσιστράτη/Lysistrata)	Sabahattin Eyuboğlu	Türkiye İş Bankası Kültür Yayınları	ISBN 9789754582239
2001	Homeros - Gül ile Söyleşi (Homer - Interview with Rose)		Türkiye İş Bankası Kültür Yayınları	ISBN 9789754581775
2002	Mektuplarıyla Halikarnas Balıkçısı (Letters of the Fisherman of Halicarnassus)		Can Yayınları	ISBN 9789750702150
2002	Osmanlı Münevverinden Türk Aydınına (From Ottoman to Turkish)		Can Yayınları	ISBN 9789750702167
2005	Homer’s Odysseia (Ὀδύσσεια/The Odyssey)	A. Kadir	Can Yayınları	ISBN 9789755103785
2005	Homer: Tepegözlerin Mağarasında (In the Cave of the Cyclops)	A. Kadir	Can Yayınları	ISBN 9789750705748
2006	François Rabelais’ Gargantua	Sabahattin Eyuboğlu, Vedat Günyol	Türkiye İş Bankası Kültür Yayınları	ISBN 9789754587159
2009	Mavi Anadolu (Blue Anatolia)		Can Yayınları	ISBN 9789750706394
2009	Troya Masalları (Troy Tales)		Günışığı Kitaplığı	ISBN 9789944717267
2012	Sophocles’ Elektra” (Ἠλέκτρα/Elektra)		Türkiye İş Bankası Kültür Yayınları	ISBN 9786053606390
2013	Colette’s Cicim (Chéri)		Can Yayinlari	ISBN 9789755102863
2013	Colette’s Dişi Kedi (La Chatte/The cat)		Can Yayınları	ISBN 9789755102856
2013	Aeschylus’ Zincire Vurulmuş Prometheus (Προμηθεύς Δεσμώτης/Prometheus Bound)	Sabahattin Eyuboğlu	Türkiye İş Bankası Kültür Yayınları	ISBN 9789754582062
2013	Aristophanes’ Eşekarıları, Kuşlar, Kömürcüler, Barış, Kadınlar Savaşı (The Wasps, The Birds, The Acharnians, Peace, Lysistrata)	Sabahattin Eyuboğlu	Türkiye İş Bankası Kültür Yayınları	ISBN 9789754588965
2014	Homer’s İlyada (Ἰλιάς/The Iliad)	A. Kadir	Türkiye İş Bankası Kültür Yayınları	ISBN 9786053321026
2014	Plato’s Şölen - Dostluk (Συμπόσιον/Symposium)	Sabahattin Eyuboğlu	Türkiye İş Bankası Kültür Yayınları	ISBN 9789754587623
2015	Aglayan Kaya Niobe Siirler (The Weeping Rock of Niobe - Poetry)	Hakký Avan, Seval Arslan, A. Kadir Guzel	Arkeoloji ve Sanat Yayinlari	ISBN 9786053963172
2015	Gulleyla'ya Anilar: En hakiki mürşit (Gulleyla Memories: The Most Genuine Artist)		Can Yayinlari	ISBN 9789750701788
2015	Mavi Yolculuk II (Blue Voyage/Blue Cruise II)	Faruk Kırkan (editor)	Inkilap Kitabevi	ISBN 9789751011510
2015	Mitoloji Sözlüğü (Dictionary of Mythology)		Remzi Kitabevi	ISBN 9789751403919
2015	Sevgi Yönetimi (Love Management)		Can Yayinlari	ISBN 9789750702662
2016	Antoine de Saint-Exupéry’s Küçük Prens (Le Petit Prince: La planète des Globus)		Eksik Parça	ISBN 9786059864534
2016	Hesiod’s Theogonia - İşler ve Günler (Θεογονία - Ἔργα καὶ Ἡμέραι/Theogony - Works and Days)	Sabahattin Eyüboğlu	Türkiye İş Bankası Kültür Yayınları	ISBN 9786053327776
2017	Halikarnas Balıkçısı: Düşün Yazıları (Halicarnassus Fisherman: Thought Articles)	Halikarnas Balıkçısı	Bilgi Yayınevi	ISBN 9789754943818
2017	Osmanlı Münevverinden Türk Aydınına (From Ottoman to Turkish)		Can Yayınları	ISBN 9789750702167
2017	Vincent Van Gogh’s Theo’ya Mektuplar (Dear Theo: The Letters of Vincent Van Gogh)		Remzi Kitabevi	ISBN 9789751417862
