= Blue Cruise =

Recreational voyages along the Turkish Riviera

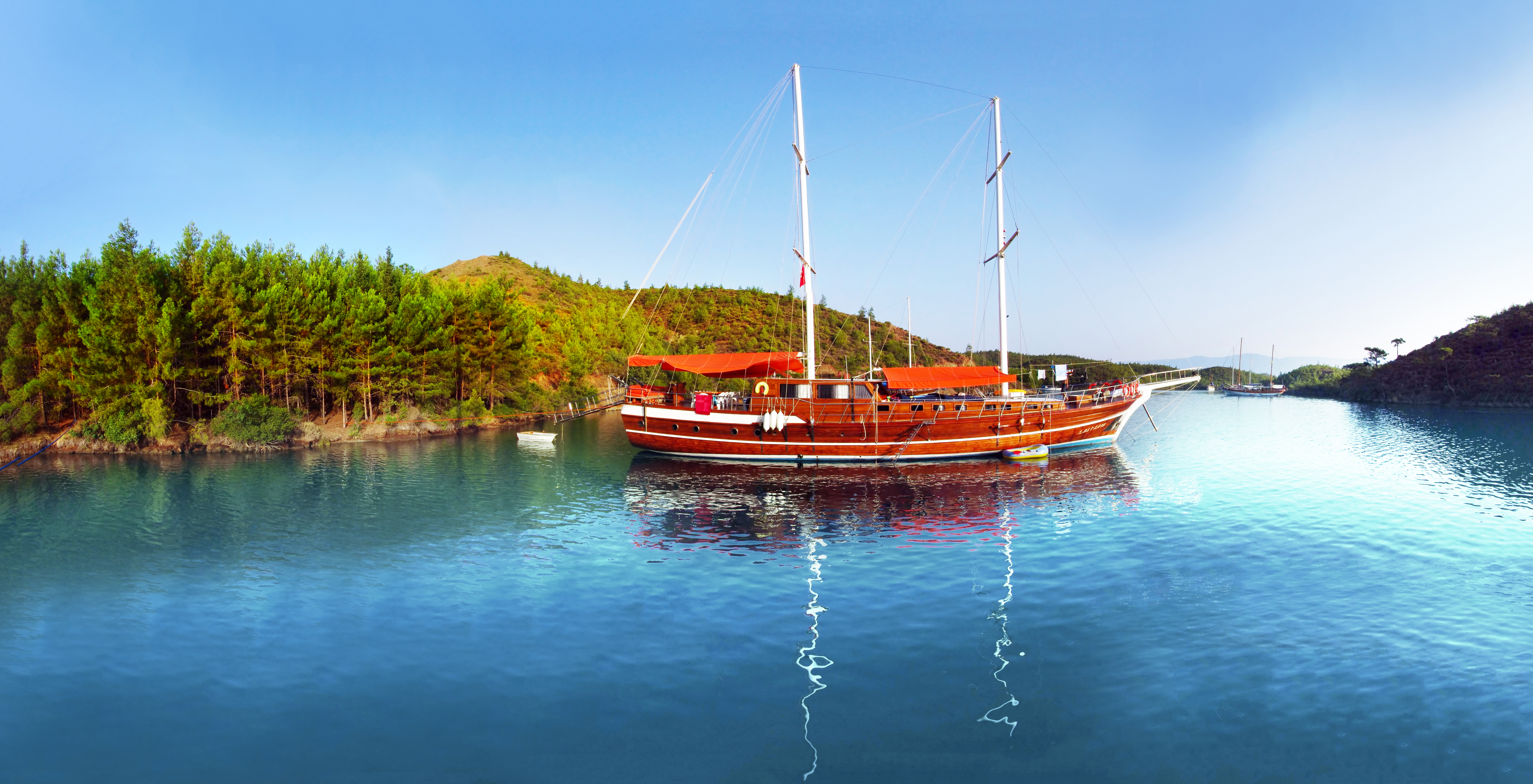
Traditional two-masted gulet schooner visiting a cove in Gökova as part of the Blue Voyage

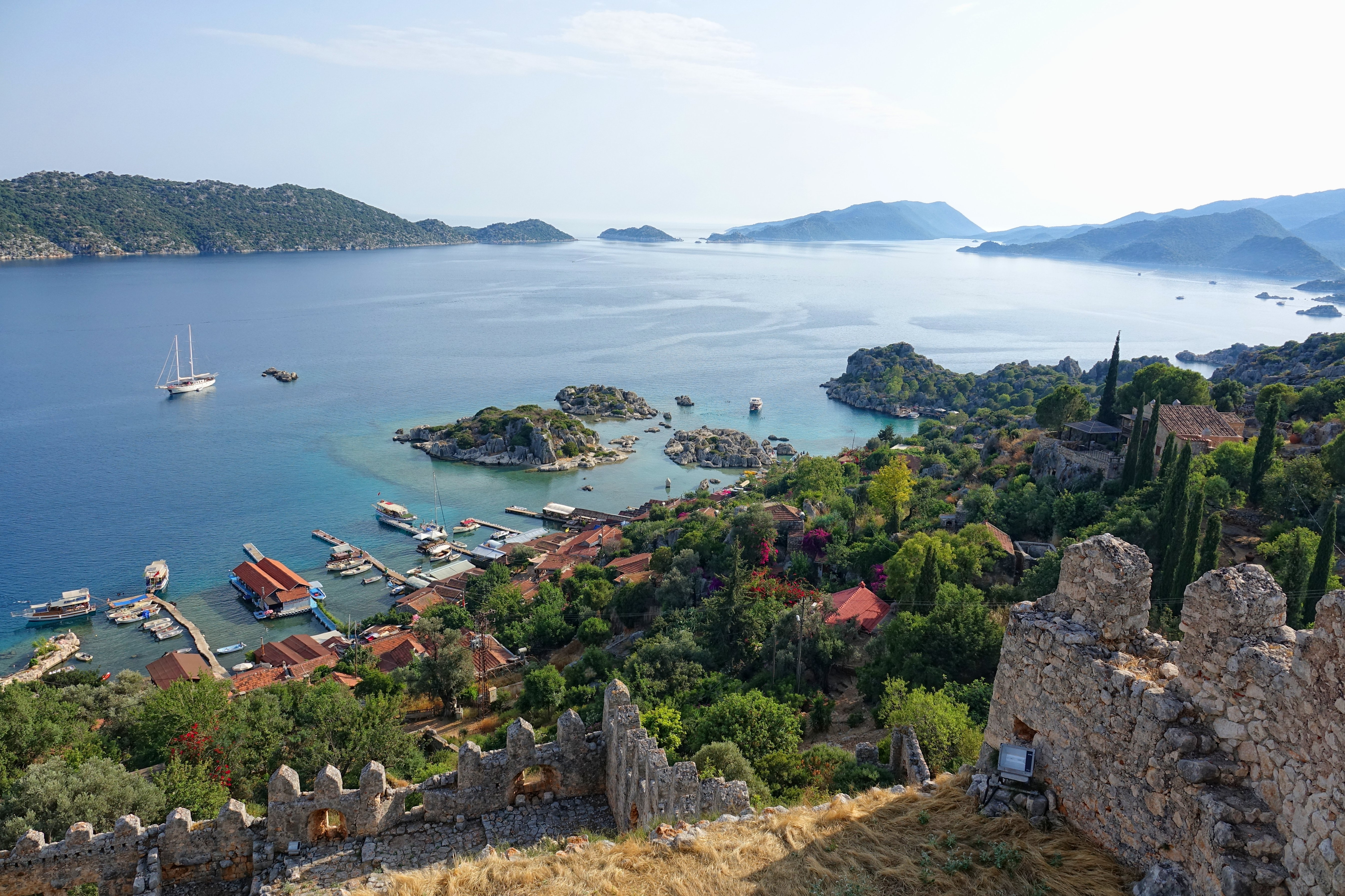
The Isle of Kekova is among the popular destinations of the Blue Cruise.

A Blue Cruise, also known as a Blue Voyage (Turkish: Mavi Yolculuk) or Blue Tour (Turkish: Mavi Tur), is a term used for recreational voyages along the Turkish Riviera, on Turkey's southwestern coast along the Aegean and Mediterranean seas. The cruise is typically a week-long trip aboard the local gulet schooners, to ancient cities, harbors, tombs, and beaches in the numerous small coves along the country's Turquoise Coast.

Carian Cruise is a lesser-known synonym used by some sources internationally, in reference to the term Caria — the name this region of southwest Turkey was called in ancient times.

== History ==
The term Blue Voyage, which is used in Turkey's tourism industry, has its origins in Turkish literature, deriving from the title of a book by Azra Erhat, and was first introduced into Turkish literature by a handful of writers, such as Cevat Şakir Kabaağaçlı (alias The Fisherman of Halicarnassus). The author, who had been exiled to Bodrum in 1925, began taking trips with his friends on the local sponge divers' sailing boats, called gulets, and was moved and inspired by the local culture and natural beauty. These excursions became known as "Blue Voyages".

Fellow author Sabahattin Eyüboğlu, together with his circle of family and friends, participated in Blue Cruises, as did Azra Erhat. The literary review "Yeni Ufuklar" (New Horizons) in the 1950s and 1960s contributed to publicizing the Blue Cruise, and numerous guidebooks were published in Turkish and German presenting romantic depictions of the voyage. Since that time, cruise tourism has grown to support a sizable portion of the local economy, and transformed Bodrum from a fishing village to a holiday destination.

== Routes ==
The routes can be as short as traveling to a few coves for a couple days, or can be as extensive as traveling the entire length of the Turkish Riviera across several weeks. There are options to start a voyage in the Turquoise Coast including Bodrum, Marmaris, Fethiye and Antalya en route to the smaller villages and coves like Dalyan, Gökova, Kekova, and similar destinations, which constitute the more popular portions of the route. It is also possible to visit Greece, and surrounding Greek islands.

== Vessels ==
In order to navigate these routes, one has to choose an appropriate sailing vessel. The traditional wooden yachts are the most suitable boat type for a sailing holiday in Turkey. These motor sailers come in three distinct types, the most popular of which is the gulet. Each boat type provides a different set of features that contribute to a comfortable and delightful journey into the blue.

Gulet: The gulet is considered the best type of traditional wooden boat for a sailing holiday. Characterized by its broad stern, a gulet provides ample space for comfortable daily living. Ranging in length from 15 to 55 meters, gulets are ideal for accommodating groups ranging from 6 to 24 individuals.

Square Sterned Boat: Square sterned boats, as the name suggests, are noted for their square sterns. This design feature affords additional space for extra cabins when compared to gulets. Like the gulets, they also range in length from 15 to 55 meters and are ideal for groups of 6 to 24 people.

Tirhandil: The tirhandil is the oldest type of wooden yacht optimal for voyaging the Aegean Sea. Noted for its pointed stern, tirhandils are smaller than their counterparts, ranging from 11 to 30 meters in length.

These vessel options are meant to ensure that travelers can embark on their voyage with utmost comfort and satisfaction, tailoring their experience to their group size and personal preference.

== See also ==
- Marinas in Turkey
- Tirhandil
- Gulet
