= Omar Ahmed Sodani =

Libyan murder suspect

Omar Ahmed Sodani was "a prominent figure in Muammar Gaddafi's regime" suspected of having murdered PC Yvonne Fletcher outside the Libyan embassy in London (where he worked) in 1984.
