= The Baltic Times =

Latvian monthly newspaper

- Headquarters
- Type: Bi-annual newspaper
- Format: Print; online
- Publisher: Gene Zolotarev
- Editor: Linas Jegelevičius
- Founded: 1996
- Headquarters: Rūpniecības iela 1 - 5; LV-1010; Riga, Latvia
- Country: Latvia
- ISSN: 1407-2300
- Website: www.baltictimes.com

The Baltic Times is an independent bi-annual newspaper that covers the political, economic, business, and cultural events in the Baltic states.

== History ==
The paper was formed from a merger in 1996 of the Baltic Independent and Baltic Observer. It started with offices in Tallinn, Estonia and Vilnius, Lithuania, with headquarters in Riga, Latvia. The Baltic Times remains the only English language print and online newspaper covering all three Baltic states.

Between 1996 and 2012 The Baltic Times was published weekly and then, until September 2013, twice a month, before moving into monthly publishing. The Lithuanian office was liquidated in 2024 with the newspapers availability reduced to bi-annual as of 2026.
