= Mohamed Abdoulkader Mohamed =

Djiboutian politician

Mohamed Abdoulkader Mohamed (born 1951) is a Djiboutian politician. He is a member of the National Assembly and a member of the Pan-African Parliament from Djibouti.

Mohamed was born at Katoumbati in Dikhil Region. A member of the Political Bureau of the Front for the Restoration of Unity and Democracy (FRUD), he was first elected to the National Assembly in the December 1997 parliamentary election; he was the 10th candidate on the joint candidate list of the People's Rally for Progress (RPP) and FRUD in Dikhil Region. He was re-elected in the January 2003 parliamentary election as the 11th candidate on the candidate list of the Union for a Presidential Majority (UMP) coalition in Dikhil Region.

Following the 2003 election, Mohamed was elected as President of the FRUD Parliamentary Group and Vice-President of the Legislation and General Administration Commission in the National Assembly on 26 January 2003. On 10 March 2004, Mohamed was chosen by the National Assembly as one of Djibouti's initial five members of the Pan-African Parliament.

Mohamed was re-elected to the National Assembly in the February 2008 parliamentary election as the fourth candidate on the UMP's candidate list for Dikhil Region.

== See also ==
- List of members of the Pan-African Parliament
