= Abdul Kader Kamli =

Abdul Kader Kamli is a researcher and consultant on information and communications technology (ICT) in the Arab world, and the president and research director of Madar Research Group, which he founded in 2002. He is often quoted by regional and international media organizations on the digital migration of the region, and has published over 150 articles in professional journals and magazines.

Kamli has acted as a consultant on various fields of the knowledge economy, including ICT adoption by governments, industry sectors and individuals, e-learning, e-banking, and other applications of ICT.

== Career ==
Kamli holds a university degree in engineering. He co-founded Ajeeb.com, a horizontal web portal based on Sakhr Software technology. In 2001, while serving as general manager of Ajeeb.com, Kamli founded the Ajeeb Research Unit, which specialized in researching the Arab knowledge economy and developed the first Arab news aggregator, Johaina. He founded the Madar Research Group in 2002.

Kamli was also a co-founder of the Middle East edition of PC Magazine, and founder of Internet Arab World magazine, published by the Dabbagh Information Technology Group (DIT). He served a long tenure as editor-in-chief for both publications.

== Research projects ==
- Qatar ICT Landscape 2009 (based on 14 field surveys)
- Abu Dhabi e-Maturity 2008 (based on 13 field surveys)
- Regional Profile of the Information Society in Western Asia (ESCWA 2007)
- UAE Knowledge Economy 2006
- e-Government in Gulf Cooperation Council (GCC) -2005
- e-Commerce in Gulf Cooperation Council (GCC) -2005
- e-Banking in Gulf Cooperation Council (GCC) -2005
- (e-Learning in Gulf Cooperation Council (GCC) -2005
- Dubai Knowledge Economy 2003-2008
- Tens of other research studies in the field of ICT and Knowledge Economy

== Articles written ==
- Statistical Irregularities and its Impact on Measuring the Information Society in the ESCWA Region (ICT Review publication, page 7)
- Building a New Arabic Search Engine - Cultural Necessity and Success Factors
- Per Capita Bandwidth and the Digital Divide in the Arab Countries
- Oil Revenues and Knowledge Economy
- A Millennium-Old Tradition of Knowledge Wasted
- Toward Standard ICT Indicators for MENA
- FDI-Based Innovation: A Priority for Arab Countries
- Building a Research Culture in the Arab World
- Two-Layer Literacy for Knowledge-Based Economy
- Attracting Foreign Investment
- Building Arab Innovation System Why and How
- The Quest to Find a Role in the Digital Age
- GCC Public Expenditure on Education
