= Abdulqadir al-Baghdadi =

- Born: 1952; Libya
- Died: August 29, 2011 (aged 58–59) near Tarhuna, Libya

Dr. Abdulqadir Mohammed al-Baghdadi (1952 – August 2011, Tarhuna) was Secretary General of the People's Committee for Education of Libya under Muammar Gaddafi. He chaired the oil and gas council and the Libya Investment Authority. He also served as the head liaison of Revolutionary Committees. He was part of Gaddafi's inner circle. After the outbreak of the First Libyan Civil War, he was sanctioned by the United Nations Security Council.

He was an official in the Libyan Embassy in London on 17 April 1984, at the time WPC Yvonne Fletcher was shot outside the embassy.

His bullet-ridden body was found in Tarhuna in August 2011 shortly after the Fall of Tripoli.
