= Abdul Qadir Jilani (Pakistani scholar) =

Pakistani Sunni scholar and jurist

Syed Syed Abdul Qadir Jilani الشيخ سيد عبد القادر الجيلاني
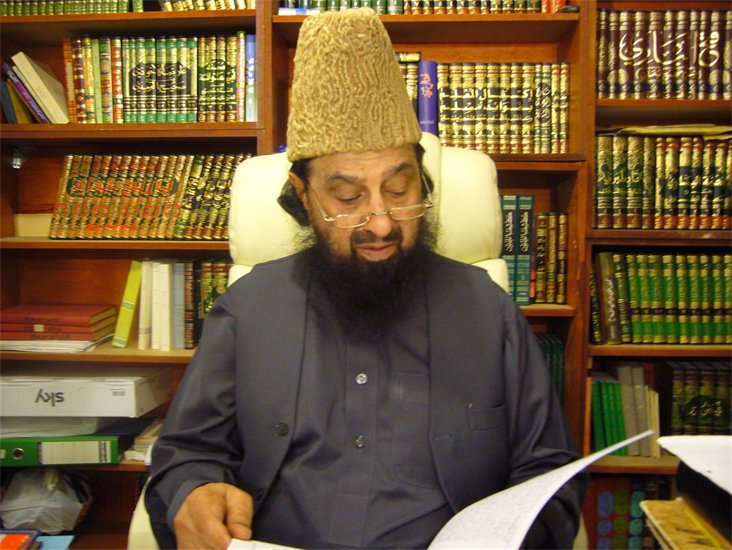
- Syed Abdul Qadir Jilani in 2011
- Succeeded by: Syed Ali Imam Jilani
- Title: Mufakkir al-Islam

Personal life
- Born: December 14, 1935 Rawalpindi, Pakistan
- Died: October 18, 2025 (aged 89) Walthamstow, London, United Kingdom
- Era: Modern
- Region: South Asia
- Main interest(s): Theology, jurisprudence, Sufism
- Website: jilanimedia.com

Religious life
- Religion: Islam
- Denomination: Sunni
- Jurisprudence: Hanafi
- Tariqa: Qadiriyyah
- Creed: Maturidi
- Movement: Barelvi

Syed Abdul Qadir Jilani (Persian: عبد القادر گیلانی, Urdu: عبد القادر گیلانی Abdolqāder Gilāni) (14 December 1935 – 18 October 2025) was a Sunni scholar and jurist. He was born in a village called Sandhu Sayyidan, Rawalpindi, Pakistan, to Walayat Ali Shah Gilani. He was a descendant of Abdul Qadir Gilani and Hasan ibn Ali.

Syed Abdul Qadir Jilani spent much of his later life in Walthamstow, East London, where he continued his religious work and scholarship. He died on 18 October 2025, at the age of 89, after a period of illness.

== Major work ==
In 2010, Jilani published his book, Zubdah at-Tahqiq. Written in Urdu, it is a text on the companions of Muhammad and the difference of opinion amongst Sunni scholars regarding the status of Abu Bakr as the greatest companion.

== Ofcom ruling ==
In October 2011, Jilani appeared as a guest on Rehmatul Lil Alameen, a programme on UK television station DM Digital. During the broadcast, Jilani made comments with reference to the shooting death in early 2011 of the Punjab governor Salmaan Taseer.

Following a complaint, Ofcom subsequently ruled that by broadcasting the comments, DM Digital had breached Rule 3.1 of the Broadcasting Code, which states "Material likely to encourage or incite the commission of crime or to lead to disorder must not be included in television or radio services". Ofcom ruled that, "on a reasonable interpretation of the scholar's remarks, he was personally advocating that all Muslims had a duty to attack or kill apostates or those perceived to have insulted the Prophet. We considered that the broadcast of the various statements made by the Islamic scholar outlined above was likely to encourage or incite the commission of crime."

In response, it was made clear that Jilani was commenting on the law of Pakistan in relation to those who were alleged to have profaned the character of Muhammad. In this instance, Jilani was discussing the case of Mumtaz Qadri who had been sentenced to death by the Court of Pakistan for killing the governor Salmaan Taseer. In conclusion if the comments were taken literally, then Jilani's comments could be offensive to some in the UK, however it should be made clear that the speech was delivered in the Urdu language and he was referring to the laws, customs and practices of Pakistan.
