= Murder of Yvonne Fletcher =

1984 shooting of a British police officer

Coordinates: 51.50785°N 0.13514°W

Yvonne Fletcher
- Fletcher, wounded on the ground, attended by her colleagues
- Born: 15 June 1958; Semley, Wiltshire, England
- Died: 17 April 1984 (aged 25); Westminster, London, England
- Police career
- Department: Metropolitan Police Service
- Service years: 1977–1984
- Rank: Woman Police Constable

The murder of Yvonne Fletcher, a Metropolitan Police officer, occurred on 17 April 1984, when she was fatally wounded by a shot fired from the Libyan embassy on St James's Square, London, by an unknown gunman. Fletcher had been deployed to monitor a demonstration against the Libyan leader Muammar Gaddafi, and died shortly afterwards. Her death resulted in an eleven-day siege of the embassy, at the end of which those inside were expelled from the country and the United Kingdom severed diplomatic relations with Libya.

Between 1980 and 1984 Gaddafi had ordered the deaths of several exiled opponents of his regime; bombings and shootings, targeted at Libyan dissidents, occurred in Manchester and London. Five Libyans thought to be behind the attacks were deported from the UK. During the anti-Gaddafi protest on 17 April 1984, two gunmen opened fire from the first floor of the embassy with Sterling submachine guns. In addition to the murder of Fletcher, eleven Libyan demonstrators were wounded. The inquest into Fletcher's death reached the verdict that she was "killed by a bullet coming from one of two windows on the west side of the front on the first floor of the Libyan People's Bureau". Following the breaking of diplomatic relations, Libya arrested six British nationals, the last four of whom were released after nine months in captivity.

Two years after Fletcher's murder, the event became a factor in the decision by the British prime minister, Margaret Thatcher, to allow the US bombing of Libya from bases in the UK. In 1999, a warming of diplomatic relations between Britain and Libya led to a statement from the Libyan government admitting culpability in Fletcher's shooting, and the payment of compensation. British police continued their investigation until 2017. Although sufficient evidence existed to prosecute one of the co-conspirators, no charges were brought as some of the evidence could not be raised in court due to national security concerns. As at 2026 no one has been convicted of Fletcher's murder, although in 2021 the High Court of Justice determined that Gaddafi's ally Saleh Ibrahim Mabrouk was jointly liable for Fletcher's murder.

== Background ==
=== Yvonne Fletcher ===
Fletcher's warrant card photograph

Yvonne Joyce Fletcher was born on 15 June 1958 in the Wiltshire village of Semley, to Michael Fletcher and his wife Queenie (née Troke). Yvonne was the eldest of the couple's four daughters. At the age of three she told her parents that she wanted to join the police. By the time she was eighteen and a half—the minimum entry age into the Metropolitan Police Service—she was 5 feet 2.5 inches (1.59 m) tall, shorter than the 5 feet 4 inches (1.63 m) required. She applied to several police forces but was turned down on the basis of her height, and considered applying for entry to the Royal Hong Kong Police Force.

Despite the height restriction, in March 1977 Fletcher was accepted onto the Metropolitan Police 20-week training course. She passed and was placed on the standard two-year probation period with the warrant number 4257; she was posted to Bow Street police station, where she completed her probation and was confirmed as a regular Woman Police Constable (WPC). She was highly regarded by her colleagues, who nicknamed her "Super Fletch", and she became engaged to PC Michael Liddle, who also worked at Bow Street.

=== Relations between Britain and Libya ===
St James's Square, London

From 1979 there had been no Libyan ambassador appointed to the United Kingdom. A "Revolutionary Committee" was in control of the Libyan embassy in London, located at 5 St James's Square; the embassy was renamed the "People's Bureau". (Note: Gaddafi came to power in Libya in a 1969 coup d'état. In 1977 the country adopted the "Declaration of the Establishment of the People's Authority", which marked the start of the Libyan Arab Jamahiriya. In 1979 the Libyan embassy in London was turned into a "People's Bureau" under the leadership of Moussa Koussa, a Gaddafi loyalist.) In 1980 Libya's leader Muammar Gaddafi—the Chairman of the Revolutionary Command Council—saw many exiles from Libya as traitors and had given orders for several of them to be murdered. On his instructions, bombs were planted in London newsagents that sold newspapers critical of Gaddafi. Moussa Koussa was appointed as Secretary of the Libyan People's Bureau in London in 1979. He was expelled from the UK in 1980, after stating in an interview with The Times that the Libyan government planned to murder two opponents of Gaddafi's government living in the UK. The Lord Privy Seal, Sir Ian Gilmour, told the House of Commons that the government wished "to maintain good relations with Libya", but that "we are making it clear that the Libyan authorities must understand what can and cannot be done under the law of the United Kingdom, and that criminal actions in the United Kingdom must cease".

After several murders of Gaddafi's political opponents in the UK in 1980, there was a decrease in activity until 1983, when the Libyan General People's Congress—the country's legislature—began a campaign against what they saw as the bourgeois habits of staff at several of the People's Bureaux, particularly the office in London. In February 1983 the bureau chief and cultural attaché were recalled to Libya and replaced with a four-man committee of students who had all been involved in revolutionary activities in Libya. Soon after they were appointed, they gave a press conference at which they threatened action against Libyan dissidents. On 10 and 11 March 1984 there were a series of bomb attacks in London and Manchester targeted at critics of the Gaddafi regime. The Libyan government denied being involved, but on 16 March the British government deported five Libyans said to be connected to the attacks.

=== Vienna convention and diplomatic protection ===
The protection of diplomats and their official premises is based on the Vienna Convention on Diplomatic Relations 1961, an international treaty; it was signed by 141 countries, including the UK and Libya. It was incorporated into UK law in the Diplomatic Privileges Act 1964. Among other measures, the act protects diplomats from prosecution for any crime unless the diplomat's home country waives their right to immunity. A country can declare a diplomat from another state to be persona non grata, and demand that they leave the country, but no other action can be taken against them. Diplomatic premises are also protected from entry by the police or security services, unless given permission by the country's ambassador.

== Shooting: 16–17 April 1984 ==
St James's Square

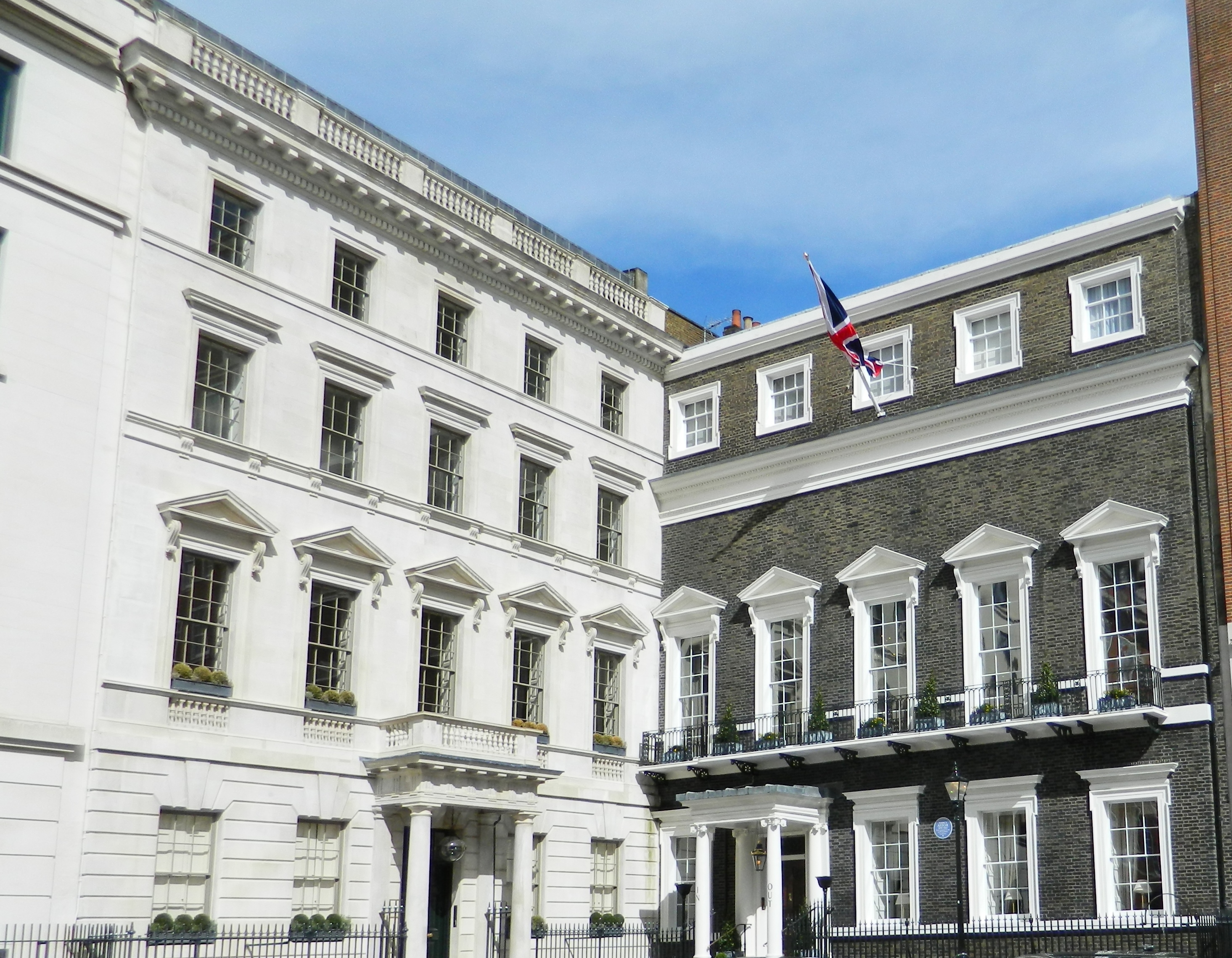
The former Libyan People's Bureau in St James's Square; the bureau was in the white building on the left of the image.

Map of St James's Square, showing where Fletcher was shot

On 16 April 1984 two students—active opponents of Gaddafi's rule—were executed in public hangings at the University of Tripoli. In response Libyan dissidents in Britain—members of the Libyan National Salvation Front (LNSF)—decided to stage a demonstration outside the People's Bureau on St James's Square. During the evening of 16 April, the People's Bureau proposed three options to Tripoli on how to deal with the demonstration: to clash directly with the demonstrators from outside the bureau, to shoot at them from inside or to prevent the event by diplomatic means. The bureau tried the third option. During the night of 16–17 April a delegation from the People's Bureau attended a meeting at the Foreign and Commonwealth Office to complain about the forthcoming demonstration, and ask that it be stopped. The Libyans were told that the Metropolitan Police would be informed, but would be unable to prevent the demonstration from going ahead.

During the night, Tripoli authorised the bureau to open fire on the protestors. The British political scientist Richard J. Aldrich writes that these messages were intercepted and decrypted by the Government Communications Headquarters (GCHQ), but not in time to avoid the shooting. Aldrich suggests that the delay was possibly because GCHQ did not work on the intercept outside their 9:00 am to 5:00 pm office hours. The authorised history of MI5, while not specifying from where the organisation received the information, says that "it was not until after the demonstration on the 17th that the Service learned" of the three options proposed by the People's Bureau to Tripoli. (Note: Oleg Gordievsky, the British spy working within the KGB London station, stated that the station was informed on 18 April by the KGB Centre in Moscow that the shooting had been personally ordered by Gaddafi.) On the morning of 17 April, police workmen placed crowd control barriers in St James's Square in preparation for the demonstration. One of the Libyans from the People's Bureau told a workman that there were guns in the bureau and there would be fighting that day. The workman passed the message on to police, who decided not to take action.

A detachment of around 30 police officers was sent to St James's Square to monitor the demonstration; among them were Fletcher and her fiancé. They were accompanied by members of the Diplomatic Protection Group. About 75 LNSF protestors arrived from across the country, particularly northern England; (Note: PC John Murray, a colleague of Fletcher's who was present at the demonstration, estimates the number to be between one and two hundred.) the demonstration began at around 10:00 am. The demonstrators—many wearing masks or balaclavas, to ensure photographers from the People's Bureau could not record their identities—stayed behind barriers placed opposite the Bureau; they chanted anti-Gaddafi slogans and carried banners and placards. A counter-demonstration by Gaddafi supporters had been arranged by the People's Bureau and took place outside the building. The demonstrations were filmed by several international television crews invited by the Libyans.

At 10:18 am automatic gunfire was discharged from two windows of the People's Bureau in the direction of the anti-Gaddafi demonstration. The shots wounded eleven protestors; according to the post-mortem examination report, one round entered Fletcher's back, "10 inches (250 mm) below the top of the right shoulder, 5 1/2 inches (140 mm) to the right of the spine and 3 1/4 inches (83 mm) behind the back fold of the right armpit". The bullet travelled right to left, through her thoracic diaphragm, liver and gall bladder before it was deflected by the spinal column out through the left side of the body, and then into the left elbow.

While the demonstrators were moved into Charles II Street, Fletcher was aided by her colleagues; as she lay in the road outside the People's Bureau, she advised them to "keep calm". She was moved to Charles II Street; she became unconscious and stopped breathing and a colleague gave her resuscitation. At 10:40 am an ambulance took her to Westminster Hospital. As she was being transferred from the ambulance to a hospital trolley, a single spent round of ammunition fell from her uniform. She was operated on, but died at approximately midday.

The police evacuated members of the public from the offices around the square, which they sealed off with a cordon; armed police took up positions facing the People's Bureau and on the surrounding rooftops. The garage entrance at the rear of the People's Bureau was not sealed off until at least ten minutes after the shooting, and in that time some of those inside departed the premises through that exit.

With Margaret Thatcher, the Prime Minister, on an official visit to Portugal, and Geoffrey Howe, the Foreign Secretary, in China, responsibility for handling the crisis fell to Leon Brittan, the Home Secretary. Events spread to Libya soon after the shooting, as around 60 members of the Revolutionary Guard Corps surrounded the British embassy in Tripoli, and put the premises under siege, trapping the staff of 25—including Oliver Miles, the ambassador. Three British nationals working in Tripoli were arrested on unspecified charges.

The post-mortem on Fletcher was undertaken in the evening of 17 April by the forensic pathologist Iain West. Examining the entry of the shot, he wrote that:

The angle of the bullet wound indicates that she was shot in the back by a person who was situated at a considerably higher level. Assuming that she was standing upright at the moment she was shot, the track would indicate that she had been shot from one of the adjacent floors of an adjacent building.

From the angle of the entry wound, and Fletcher's position in the street—captured on news cameras seconds before she was shot—West established that the shot had come from the first floor of the embassy.

== Siege: 18–27 April 1984 ==
On 18 April, Miles was allowed to leave the British embassy to meet representatives of the Libyan government; the siege in Tripoli was lifted that day and one of the men arrested the previous day was also released. The following day Gaddafi appeared on Libyan television and blamed the British police and security forces for the attack; he said that "we are surprised how a responsible state like England carry on [sic] committing this crime". Over the next week five bombs were planted in London, four of which were defused; on 20 April the fifth bomb exploded in the baggage area of Terminal 2 at Heathrow Airport, for which police suspected Libyan bombers. The British government's attitude towards Libya hardened as a result of the bombs, although they were also sensitive to Libya's behaviour in previous diplomatic impasses, whereby the regime would arrest citizens of a country and hold them until the normalisation of formal relations. There were 8,000 British workers in Libya, mostly working in the oil and construction industries.

The British government requested access to the People's Bureau, which was denied by the Libyan government. Two Libyan diplomats who were not in the embassy at the time of the shooting acted as intermediaries between police negotiators and those inside the building. The government also put the Special Air Service on standby; they flew from Stirling Lines, their base in Credenhill, Herefordshire, to London in preparation. Negotiations did not progress well, and on 22 April Britain informed the Libyan government that diplomatic ties were broken; the diplomats in the embassy were given until midnight on 29 April to leave the country, and Britain instructed its embassy staff to leave Tripoli by the same time.

Fletcher's hat and four other officers' helmets were left lying in the square during the ensuing siege. In the days that followed, images of them were repeatedly shown in the British media. In the early morning of 27 April a policeman acted against orders and retrieved the hat from the square. It was placed on Fletcher's coffin for her funeral, which took place the same day at Salisbury Cathedral. In addition to 600 police officers, Leon Brittan attended, as did Lawrence Byford, the Chief Inspector of Constabulary and Kenneth Newman, the Commissioner of the Metropolitan Police. (Note: After the funeral Fletcher's police hat was given to the Black Museum at Scotland Yard.)

On the same day as Fletcher's funeral the evacuation of the embassy began with the dispatch of diplomatic luggage—four canvas bags, marked with a diplomatic seal, and immune from search or seizure by the British police. Neutral intermediaries from Saudi Arabia, Syria and Turkey oversaw the exit of goods and staff. The 30 staff in the embassy were allowed out in groups of five, instructed to walk in single-file with a gap between each of them; there was a 15-minute pause between each group exiting the building. Each person was frisked, photographed and questioned, but when attempts were made to fingerprint the men, they objected and the neutral intermediaries advised the police that this was not allowed. After being taken to the Civil Service College at Sunningdale where they were held for the day and questioned, the Libyans were put on a flight to Tripoli just before 8:00 pm. The same day, the remaining members of staff from the British embassy, including the ambassador, returned to London.

== Aftermath: 27 April 1984 – 5 February 1985 ==
Once the Libyans had left the People's Bureau, police forensics teams entered and searched the square and the embassy building. Within the building—where they spent four days searching—gunshot residue was found at two windows on the first floor and a spent cartridge. With that evidence, and from the location of the bullets in the square, the police ascertained that two Sterling submachine guns had been fired, one pointing down at the demonstrators and one on a flatter trajectory across the square. The police search of the bureau found 4,367 rounds of ammunition, three semi-automatic pistols, four .38 revolvers and magazines for Sterling submachine guns. (Note: Forensic tests established that one of the handguns had been used to murder a Libyan journalist.) The search of the embassy was made by civilian experts employed by the police, accompanied by observers from Saudi Arabia.

The inquest into Fletcher's death opened on 25 April but was adjourned to allow for the police to undertake further investigations. When it reconvened, police reported that they had 400 lines of enquiry open into the murder, but had not narrowed the field of suspects down from any of the 30 Libyans in the embassy. Iain West stated that the bullet entered Fletcher's body at an angle of between 60 and 70 degrees. Paul Knapman, the coroner heading the inquest, considered the angle too steep to have been fired from the first floor and questioned West on the point. The pathologist stated that Fletcher must have been turning when she was shot which, he said, would have reduced the angle. The jury concluded that Fletcher "was killed by a bullet coming from one of two windows on the west side of the front on the first floor of the Libyan People's Bureau".

In April and May 1984 six British men working in Libya were rounded up and detained as hostages by a Revolutionary Committee. The Libyans demanded the restoration of diplomatic relations and the release of Libyans arrested on terror offences. Two of the men were freed in September, and in October Terry Waite—special envoy for the Archbishop of Canterbury—visited Libya in an attempt to negotiate the release of the remaining men, the first of his four visits. The hostages were freed on 5 February 1985, after nine months in detention.

== Subsequent developments ==
=== Gaddafi era: 1985–2011 ===
Although there were rumours that four members of the embassy had been executed on their return to Libya, the reports were not considered reliable by the British government. The government did not try to re-open diplomatic relations with Libya for several years, and interaction between the two governments remained poor. In 1986 Thatcher agreed to the use of Royal Air Force bases by American aircraft involved in the bombing of Libya; she said in the House of Commons that the murder of Fletcher weighed in her decision. In 1991 the warrants issued to two Libyan men for the 1988 Lockerbie bombing further damaged British–Libyan relations. Abdul Fatah Younis, Libya's Minister for Public Security, met Christopher Long, Britain's ambassador to Egypt in 1992. Younis apologised for his country's role in Fletcher's murder, and offered to assist with the extradition of her killers; the offer was not accepted, but led to discussions between the two countries, which were kept secret.

The Channel 4 Dispatches documentary, broadcast in April 1996, posited that the shots were fired from a different building, from an upper floor that had been rented by MI5, and that the shots had been from agents of MI5 or the American CIA, to discredit the Libyan regime. (Note: The programme—which included the opinions of the British Army's senior ballistics officer, Lieutenant Colonel George Styles, the Home Office pathologist Bernard Knight and army surgeon and forensic pathologist Hugh Thomas—raised the question of the entry angle of the bullet that killed Fletcher. The conclusion of those interviewed was that the bullet could not have come from the first floor of the embassy, and could not have been from a Sterling submachine gun.) The contents of the programme were raised in question in the House of Commons by Tam Dalyell, and answered by David Maclean, the Minister of State for Home Affairs, who stated that "The programme asks us to believe that WPC Fletcher was murdered by, or with the connivance of, a British or American intelligence officer. If it were not so offensive and obscene, it would be laughable." He concluded that it was the Libyans in the bureau who should co-operate with the murder investigation.

In July 1999 the Libyan government publicly accepted responsibility for the murder, agreed to pay compensation of £250,000 to Fletcher's family and agreed to support the investigation into Fletcher's murder. In a statement to the House of Commons, the Foreign Secretary, Robin Cook announced:

Libya accepts general responsibility for the actions of those in the Libyan People's Bureau at the time of the shooting. It expresses deep regret to the family of WPC Fletcher for what occurred and offers to pay compensation now to the family. Libya agrees to participate in and co-operate with the continuing police investigation and to accept its outcome.

On 24 February 2004 the Today programme on BBC Radio 4 reported that Shukri Ghanem, the Libyan prime minister, had claimed his country was not responsible for Fletcher's murder or for the Lockerbie bombing. Ghanem said that Libya had made the admission and paid compensation to bring peace and an end to international sanctions. The following day a statement on Libyan radio said that Ghanem's comment was "inaccurate and regrettable"; the Libyan government offered entry to Libya for the Metropolitan Police to undertake its investigation in Tripoli. Although they were able to undertake some steps during their four-day investigation, they were not allowed to arrest anyone. On their return it was announced that a joint investigation by British police and a Libyan magistrate would undertake a formal investigation under Libyan law.

British detectives were able to interview their main suspect for the murder in June 2007, following the normalisation of diplomatic relations between the UK and Libya. Detectives spent seven weeks in Libya interviewing both witnesses and suspects. Queenie, Fletcher's mother, described the developments as "promising". That year a senior Canadian lawyer undertook a review of the available evidence for the Crown Prosecution Service. He advised that Abdulmagid Salah Ameri, a junior diplomat in the People's Bureau at the time of the shooting, had been identified by witnesses who had observed him firing a weapon from the embassy window. The report also suggested that there was sufficient evidence for two men, Matouk Mohammed Matouk and Abdulqadir al-Baghdadi, to face charges of conspiracy to murder. Both had escaped out of the garage door of the embassy on the day of the shooting; neither had diplomatic status and could, therefore, face prosecution. The report was not publicly released, but a leaked copy was obtained by The Daily Telegraph in 2009.

In 2009 Gaddafi was interviewed by Sky News and apologised for the killing of Fletcher. The same year it was established that during trade negotiations between Britain and Libya in 2006, an agreement was reached that Fletcher's killer would not be extradited for trial in the UK. In a letter to Gordon Brown, the Prime Minister, the Police Federation said they were "appalled and disgusted" by the decision. A spokesman for the Foreign Office denied that there was a secret deal, and stated that "Libyan law did not allow for the extradition for trial in other countries so a trial in Libya was the only outcome that would reflect our determination to see justice done".

=== Post-Gaddafi era: 2011–2021 ===
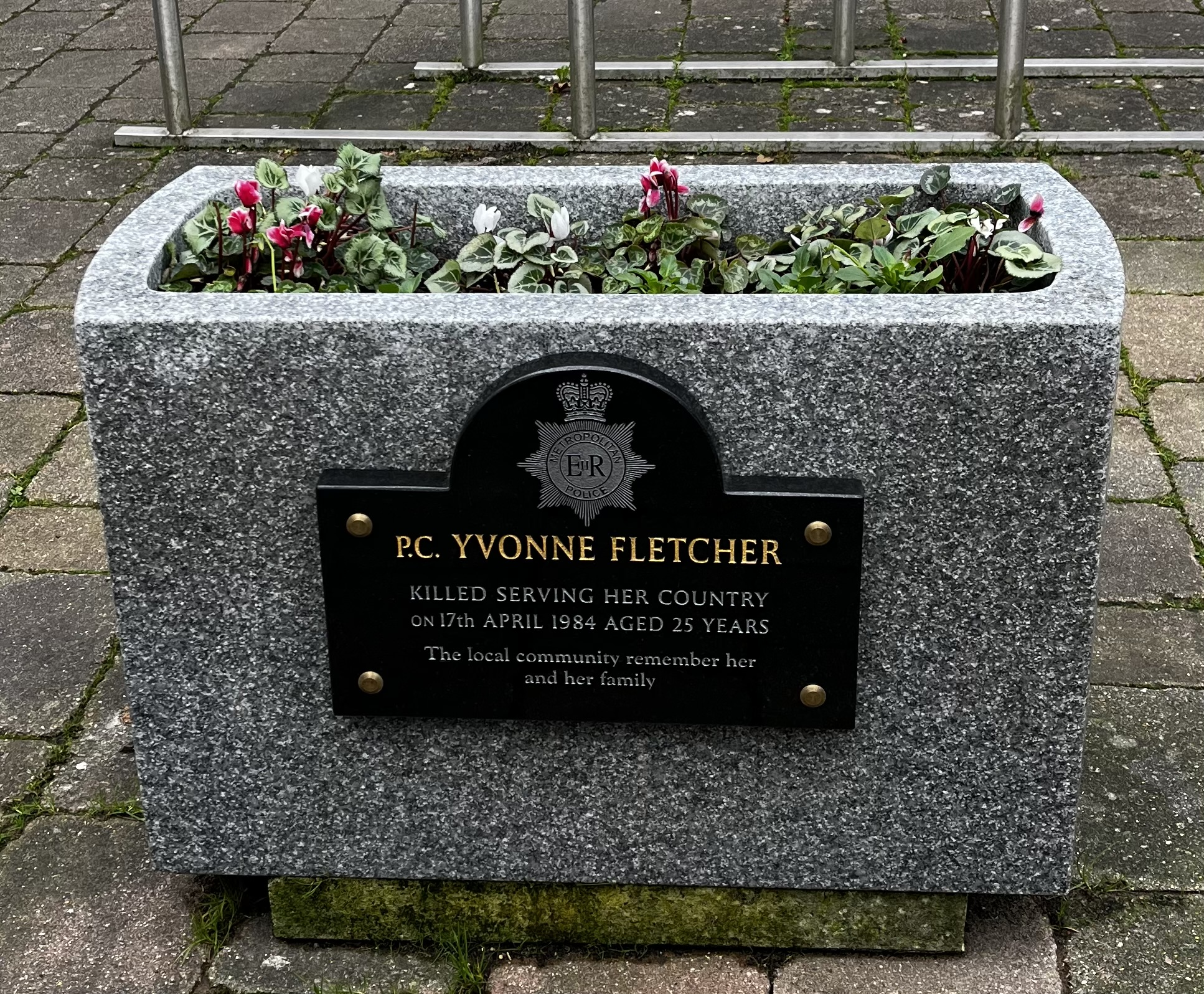
PC Yvonne Fletcher Memorial, Shaftesbury

Following the 2011 Libyan civil war and the collapse of the Gaddafi regime in August that year, it was reported that one of the co-conspirators, Abdulqadir al-Baghdadi, had been killed during in-fighting among Gaddafi loyalists. In June the following year, two police officers flew to Libya to discuss developments in the case. The following month The Sunday Telegraph named Salah Eddin Khalifa, a high-level member of the former regime, as the pro-Gaddafi student who shot Fletcher. Within minutes of the shooting, he had left the embassy via a back door before it was surrounded by police. Khalifa was said to have moved to another north African city following the civil war.

In November 2015 the Metropolitan Police arrested Saleh Ibrahim Mabrouk, a former member of the Gaddafi government and a close ally of Gaddafi who was a key member of the revolutionary committee in control of the embassy on that day; in 2011 he claimed political asylum in the UK. Although initially arrested on charges of money laundering, he was bailed on charges of conspiracy to murder Fletcher. In May 2017 the charges against him were dropped as evidence against him could not be provided in court because of national security concerns.

In November 2019, Fletcher's former colleague John Murray said he was still trying to find the murderer; in November 2021 a civil case he brought against Mabrouk, was heard at the Royal Courts of Justice in London. Mabrouk was found to be jointly liable for Fletcher's death.

== Legacy ==
Memorials

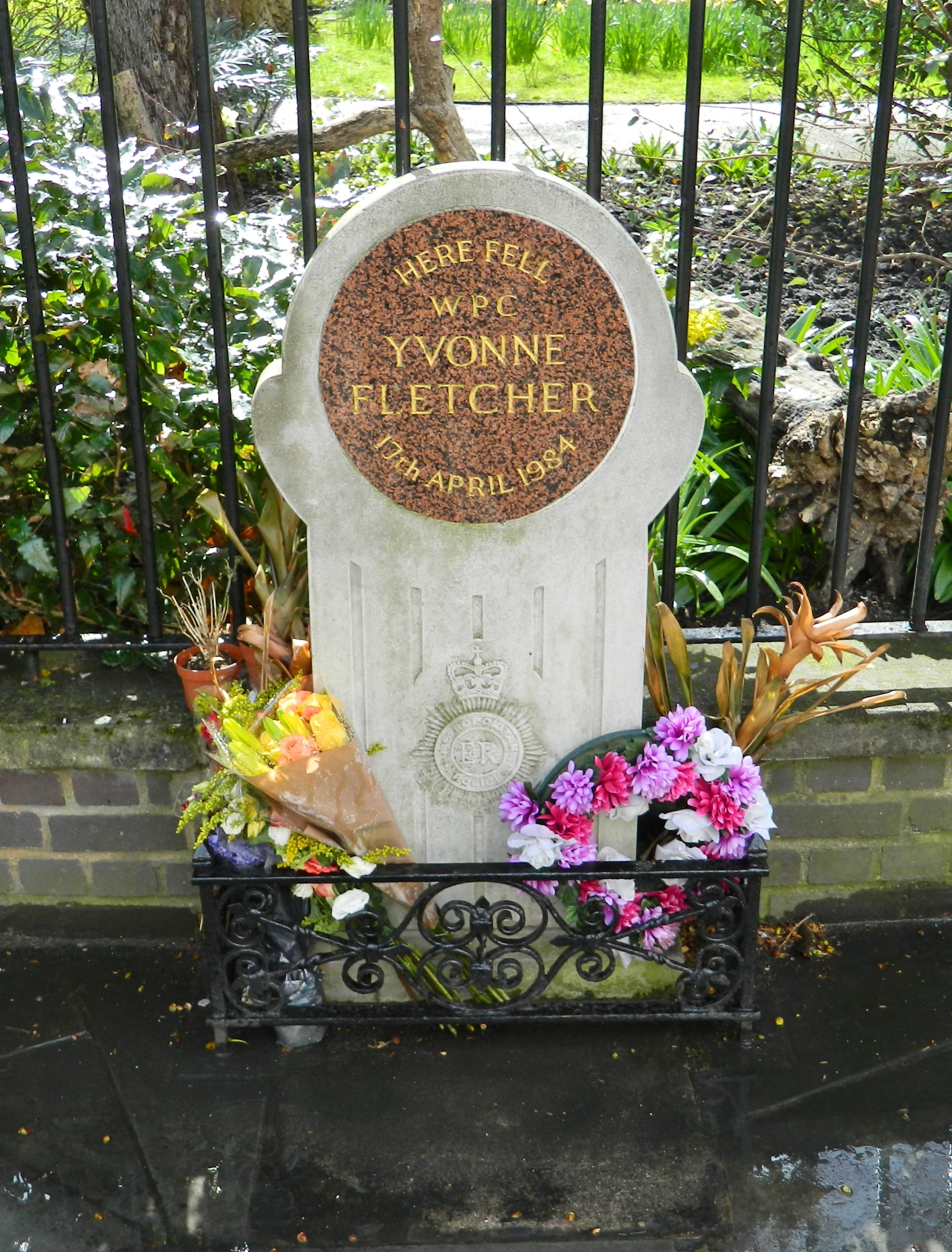
Memorial to Fletcher in St James's Square

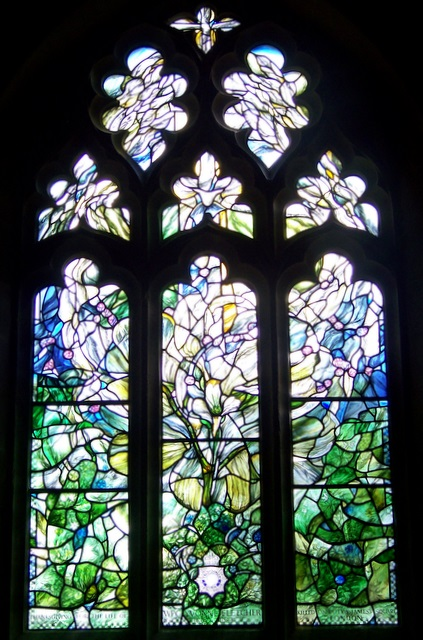
Stained glass window in St Leonard's Church, Semley

In April 1984 the film director Michael Winner wrote to The Times to suggest that a memorial be placed in St James's Square "to commemorate not only the horrific death of this brave young girl, but also be a constant reminder to her killers of the feelings of the British people". After receiving sizeable donations, Winner set up the Police Memorial Trust on 3 May to erect memorials to honour British police officers killed in the line of duty.

Fletcher became the first police officer honoured by the Police Memorial Trust. On 1 February 1985 her memorial was unveiled in St James's Square by Thatcher, in a ceremony attended by the leaders of the main British political parties. During her unveiling speech, Thatcher said:

This simple memorial, erected by the Police Memorial Trust, will be a reminder to Londoners and to visitors alike of the debt that we owe to Yvonne Fletcher and all her colleagues in the Police. Without them the law could not be upheld. Without them, indeed, there would be no law, and no liberty.

The granite and Portland stone commemorative pillar lies in the north-east corner of St James's Square, facing the former Libyan embassy. Westminster City Council altered part of the pavement with a rounded extension into the roadway to create an area for people to stand in front of it.

A cherry tree was planted in St James's Square in memory of Fletcher in 1984, and there is a memorial plaque in Charing Cross Police Station, London. In 1988 John Baker, the Bishop of Salisbury dedicated a stained glass window at St Leonard's Church, Semley, to Fletcher; the window was designed by the artist Henry Haig.

Following a government review into the law surrounding inviolability of diplomatic premises, the Diplomatic and Consular Premises Act 1987 was introduced. Among other measures, the act allows the government to remove diplomatic status from premises which they consider to be misused.

== See also ==
- List of British police officers killed in the line of duty
- List of unsolved murders in the United Kingdom

== Notes and references ==
=== Sources ===
==== Books ====
- Aldrich, Richard J. (2010). GCHQ: The Uncensored Story of Britain's Most Secret Intelligence Agency. London: HarperPress. ISBN 978-0-00-727847-3.
- Andrew, Christopher (2009). The Defence of the Realm: The Authorized History of MI5. London: Penguin Books. ISBN 978-0-1410-2330-4.
- Ashman, Chuck; Trescott, Pamela (1986). Outrage: The Abuse of Diplomatic Immunity. London: W.H. Allen. ISBN 978-0-491-03713-6.
- Belfield, Richard (2005). The Assassination Business. New York: Carroll & Graf. ISBN 978-0-7867-1343-1.
- Davis, Brian (1990). Qaddafi, terrorism, and the origins of the U.S. attack on Libya. New York: Praeger. ISBN 978-0-275-93302-9.
- Gould, Robert; Waldren, Michael (1986). London's Armed Police. London: Arms and Armour Press. ISBN 978-0-85368-880-8.
- Jebnoun, Noureddine; Kia, Mehrdad; Kirk, Mimi (2013). Modern Middle East Authoritarianism: Roots, Ramifications, and Crisis. Abingdon, Oxon: Routledge. ISBN 978-1-135-00731-7.
- Kirby, Dick (2013). Death on the Beat: Police Officers Killed in the Line of Duty. Barnsley, South Yorkshire: Wharncliffe. ISBN 978-1-84563-161-1.
- Moss, Alan; Skinner, Keith (2015). Scotland Yard's History of Crime in 100 Objects (Kindle ed.). Stroud, Glos: The History Press. ISBN 978-0-7509-6655-9.
- Stern, Chester (1997). Dr Iain West's Casebook. London: Warner Books. ISBN 978-0-7515-1846-7.
- Waite, Terry (1994). Taken on Trust. London: Coronet. ISBN 978-0-3406-0969-9.

==== Journals and magazines ====
- Cook, Robin (7 July 1999). "Libya". Parliamentary Debates (Hansard). House of Commons. col. 1033–1035.
- Dalyell, Tam (8 May 1996). "WPC Yvonne Fletcher". Parliamentary Debates (Hansard). House of Commons. col. 208–210.
- Gilmour, Ian (13 June 1980). "Anglo-Libyan Relations". Parliamentary Debates (Hansard). House of Commons. col. 1026–1028.
- Lambton, Lucinda (1 December 2017). "Overlooked Britain". The Oldie. p. 88.
- Maclean, David (8 May 1996). "WPC Yvonne Fletcher". Parliamentary Debates (Hansard). House of Commons. col. 211–216.
- Murray, John (October 2009). "A Day I Shall Never Forget". Police Federation Magazine.
- Ronen, Yehudit (March 2006). "Libya's Conflict with Britain: Analysis of a Diplomatic Rupture". Middle Eastern Studies. 42 (2): 271–283. doi:10.1080/00263200500417645. JSTOR 4284446. S2CID 145321917.
- Tendler, Stewart (2011). "Fletcher, Yvonne Joyce". Oxford Dictionary of National Biography (online ed.). Oxford University Press. doi:10.1093/ref:odnb/98143. (Subscription, Wikipedia Library access or UK public library membership required.)
- Thatcher, Margaret, Prime Minister (16 April 1986). "Libya". Parliamentary Debates (Hansard). House of Commons. col. 875–878.

==== News articles ====
- "1984: Libyan embassy shots kill policewoman". BBC News. 23 January 2009.
- Aitken, Ian (26 April 1984). "Howe to review laws on diplomats". The Guardian. pp. 1 and 28.
- Bennett, Rosemary (8 April 2004). "Libya to join Fletcher inquiry". The Times. p. 2.
- Bevins, Anthony (18 April 1984). "Brittan hope for peaceful solution to siege". The Times. p. 1.
- Bhatla, Shyam; Mather, Ian; Willey, David (29 April 1984). "Envoys stopped police fingerprinting Libyans". The Observer. p. 1.
- Black, Ian (8 July 1999a). "Machine gun burst echoed for 15 years". The Guardian. p. 6.
- Black, Ian (8 July 1999b). "Britain and Libya renew diplomatic ties". The Guardian. p. 1.
- Brown, Colin (2 May 1984). "Firearms' traces found by bureau window". The Guardian. p. 8.
- Burleigh, Michael (26 March 2011). "Inside the mind of a tyrant". The Daily Telegraph. p. 23.
- Davis, Margaret (17 July 2012). "Yvonne Fletcher investigation police fly to Libya". The Independent.
- Day, Barbara (18 April 1984). "Fiancé at side of dying WPC". The Times. p. 1.
- "Did police constable Yvonne Fletcher need to die?". The Economist. 12 May 1984. p. 25.
- Dowden, Richard (22 August 1984). "MPs' visit may bring help to Britons held in Libya". The Times. p. 4.
- Dowden, Richard (6 February 1985). "Britons' freedom opens way for thaw with Libya". The Times. pp. 1 and 28.
- Evans, Michael (26 April 2000). "Britain's top diplomat boosts Libyan links". The Times. p. 18.
- Ezard, John (4 September 1984). "Relatives of four men held in Libya urge Brittan to ease visa restrictions". The Guardian. p. 2.
- Gilligan, Andrew (15 July 2012). "Named: the 'killer' of WPc Fletcher; Libyans claim man who shot policewoman is alive and urge detectives to question him 'I keep hearing this name again and again'". The Sunday Telegraph. pp. 1 and 2.
- Hamilton, Alan; Tendler, Stewart; Witherow, John (18 April 1984a). "London embassy shots kill policewoman". The Times. p. 1.
- Hamilton, Alan; Tendler, Stewart; Witherow, John (19 April 1984b). "Gaddafi phones hourly orders to the people's bureau". The Times. p. 1.
- Hawkes, Nigel (12 August 1984). "Exiles dismiss Libya 'killings'". The Observer. p. 6.
- Hope, Christopher; Rayner, Gordon; McElroy, Damien (16 October 2009). "Yvonne Fletcher and the betrayal of justice; The evidence is there to prosecute two Libyans, said a CPS report two years ago. So why has nothing been done?". The Daily Telegraph. p. 1.
- Hope, Christopher (27 August 2011). "Revealed: Yvonne Fletcher's killer; Junior diplomat was seen by key witness firing a gun, according to secret report Case detectives ready to fly back to Tripoli". The Daily Telegraph. pp. 1 and 7.
- Horsnell, Michael (13 June 1980). "Gaddafi men sentence to death two Libyan exiles in London". The Times. p. 1.
- Horsnell, Michael (28 April 1984a). "Fond farewell to Super Fletch, a diamond of a girl". The Times. p. 1.
- Horsnell, Michael (11 May 1984b). "Police have 400 lines of inquiry into WPC's killing". The Times. p. 32.
- Jones, Claire (11 November 2019). "The 35-year-old vow to a dying police officer". BBC News.
- Keel, Paul (10 May 1984a). "WPC's inquest told of Libyan's warning". The Guardian. p. 1.
- Keel, Paul (11 May 1984b). "No definite siege suspects—police". The Guardian. p. 1.
- Kerbaj, Richard (27 October 2009). "Gaddafi apologises for embassy shooting of WPC". The Times. p. 13.
- "Libyan embassy: history". The Daily Telegraph. 27 July 2011.
- Low, Robert; Mather, Ian; Bhatia, Shyam; Bailey, Martin; Nally, Michael; Lashmar, Paul (22 April 1984). "Murder in St James's Square". The Observer. p. 3.
- Lycett, Andrew (18 April 1984). "Signs of tougher Gaddafi line on dissidents began over a year ago". The Times. p. 2.
- McGrory, Daniel (26 March 2004). "WPC's killer 'may escape justice'". The Times. p. 4.
- Mather, Ian (22 April 1984). "Why envoys are inviolate". The Observer. p. 3.
- Nordheimer, Jon (25 April 1984). "Libyan exiles in Britain live in fear of Qaddafi assassins". The New York Times. p. 1.
- "Obituaries: General Abdel Fattah Younes; Confidant of Libya's Col Gaddafi who defected to the rebel cause and became commander of its forces". The Daily Telegraph. 30 July 2011. p. 29.
- Parry, Gareth; Keel, Paul; White, Michael; Kealtey, Patrick (18 April 1984). "Brittan orders 'wait and talk' tactics over siege". The Guardian. p. 1.
- Parry, Gareth; Kirby, Alex (23 April 1984). "Britain breaks off diplomatic ties with Libya". The Guardian. p. 1.
- Parry, Gareth (18 April 1984). "Wounded police woman dies in hospital". The Guardian. pp. 1 and 3.
- Rawlinson, Kevin; Dodd, Vikram (16 May 2017). "Yvonne Fletcher murder inquiry dropped over national security fears". The Guardian.
- Samstag, Tony (2 February 1985). "Without them there would be no law and no liberty". The Times. p. 2.
- Singer, Angela (18 April 1984). "The tiny girl who 'mothered' recruits". The Guardian. p. 1.
- Spencer, Richard (30 August 2011). "Libyan 'behind Yvonne Fletcher's killing' found dead". The Daily Telegraph.
- Stanhope, Henry (19 April 1984). "Diplomats released from Tripoli embassy detention". The Times. p. 1.
- Townsend, Mark (24 June 2007). "Yvonne Fletcher: the net closes in: Libya helps Scotland Yard hunt embassy sniper in return for moves to free Lockerbie bomber". The Observer. p. 4.
- Walker, Martin (19 April 1984). "Supper at home for ambassador". The Guardian. p. 1.
- Webster, Philip (26 February 2004). "Libyans offer olive branch on killing". The Times. p. 2.
- Willey, David; Raphael, Adam; Mather, Ian (22 April 1984). "Qadhafi offers 'team to help find siege killer'". The Observer. p. 1.
- Winner, Michael (21 April 1984). "Outrage at Libyan People's Bureau". The Times. p. 9.
- Winnett, Robert (15 September 2009). "Britain 'sold its soul' to Libya deal". The Daily Telegraph. p. 1.
- Witherow, John; Tendler, Stewart (28 April 1984). "Policewoman's killer goes free at end of St James's siege". The Times. pp. 1 and 34.
- "Yvonne Fletcher shooting: Libyan close to Gaddafi found jointly liable for killing of PC". BBC News. 16 November 2021.

==== Websites and television ====
- Allen, Chris (2 August 2016). "Money laundering charges dropped against Gaddafi minister accused of PC murder". Police Professional. Archived from the original on 27 December 2017.
- Dispatches: Murder in St James's (Television production). Channel 4. 10 April 1996.
- Hudson, Nick (17 May 2017). "Public will want answers to 'ending of WPC Yvonne Fletcher murder hunt', ex-force heads warn". Police Professional. Archived from the original on 28 May 2017.
- Islam, Carl (29 June 1988). "The inviolability of diplomatic and consular premises". The Law Society. Archived from the original on 17 August 2012.
- "The Police Memorial Trust". Police Roll of Honour Trust.
- Real Crime: Yvonne Fletcher (Television production). ITV. 2 September 2010.
- "St James's Square: Timeline". St James's Square Trust.
- Thatcher, Margaret (1 February 1985). "Speech at Memorial Ceremony for WPC Yvonne Fletcher". Margaret Thatcher Foundation.
- "Today: 24th February 2004". BBC Radio. Archived from the original on 8 March 2007.
- "WPC Yvonne Fletcher". Imperial War Museums.
