= Hisham Abdulqader Abdulla =

Bahraini volleyball player and coach (born 1976)

Hisham

Personal information
- Full name: Hisham Abdulqader Abdulla
- Born: 30 December 1976 (age 49); Muharraq, Bahrain
- Height: 1.86 m (6 ft 1 in)

Volleyball information
- Position: Receiver-Attacker

Career
Years	Teams
1995-2000; 2000-2007	Al-Khaleej Club; Busaiteen Club

National team
Bahrain

Hisham Abdulqader Abdulla (born December 30, 1976, in Muharraq) is a Bahraini coach and a former professional volleyball player. He is best known for his international career representing Bahrain in the youth, and junior championships during his early days winning many trophies through the 1990s. He was the captain of Busaiteen Club which he helped getting their first championship in their history.

Hisham is married and has two children. He lives in Busaiteen.
