= Abdul Kadir (Turkish poet) =

Turkish poet

İbrahim Abdulkadir Meriçboyu
- Born: 1917; Istanbul
- Died: March 1, 1985 (aged 67–68); Zincirlikuyu Cemetery, Istanbul
- Education: Istanbul University Faculty of Law
- Occupations: Writer, translator, editor, poet
- Writing career
- Pen name: A. Kadir

Abdul Kadir, full name İbrahim Abdülkadir Meriçboyu (pen name, A. Kadir; 1917, Istanbul – March 1, 1985, Istanbul), was a Turkish poet among the socialist poets of the 1940s generation.

== Early life and education ==
Kadir completed his secondary education at Eyüp Middle School (1933) and Kuleli Military High School (1936). As a final-year student at the Turkish Military Academy (1938), he was arrested with Nâzım Hikmet and sentenced to ten months in prison. After being released from prison, he completed his military service as a private. He enrolled in the Istanbul University Faculty of Law (1941).

== Career ==
His poetry book Tebliğ, published in 1943, was banned and confiscated. He was exiled by martial law along with individuals deemed problematic to remain in Istanbul. He spent his exile in Muğla, Balıkesir, Konya, Kırşehir, and Adana. In 1947, he returned to Istanbul and began working in a biscuit factory. After leaving this job, he worked as a proofreader and translator in various publishing houses. After 1965, he continued his writing career by publishing his books himself.

Having shared a cell with Nâzım Hikmet in Ankara Prison, A. Kadir was initially heavily influenced by this poet. This influence is clearly seen in the poems published in the magazines Ses and Yeni Edebiyat. His first book, Tebliğ, which expressed his love for his country, openly opposed war and realistically reflected the lives of poor people. After returning from exile, he occasionally published his poems in magazines. He and Abdülbaki Gölpınarlı translated Rumi's poems from Persian into prose and compiled them into a book titled Mevlâna in Today's Language (1955).

This highly appreciated book was reprinted several times. The translation of Iliad he did with Azra Erhat in 1958 led to A. Kadir being recognized as a successful translator. His second book, Welcome Halil İbrahim (1959), showed that he did not deviate from his poetic line despite the poetic tendencies of the period. This was followed by Four Windows (1962) and a collection of all his poems, While There is Happiness (1968). Continuing his work in translation and simplifying old poetry, A. Kadir published the books Omar Khayyam in Today's Language (1964) and Tevfik Fikret in Today's Language (1967). In 1970, the translation of Odyssey, which he again did with Azra Erhat, was published. He compiled many translations he did alone or jointly from European and Third World poets into three volumes titled World Folk and Democracy Poems (1973–1980). Additionally, his poetry translations from Brecht and Selected Poems (1961), which he translated with Asım Bezirci from Paul Eluard, received great attention. A. Kadir received the Habib Edip Törehan (1959), TDK Translation (1961), Hasan li Ediz Literary Translation (1980), and Yazko Translation (1983) awards for his translations. His work 1938 Military Academy Incident and Nâzım Hikmet (1966) is also a book of great interest for shedding light on an important event of that era.

== Death ==
Abdul Kadir died in March 1985 and is buried in Zincirlikuyu Cemetery.
