= Abdolqader Zahedi =

Iranian cleric and politician

- ملا عبدالقادر زاهدی
- Born: Saqqez, Kurdistan province, Iran
- Occupations: Religious scholar and Imam of friday prayer of Saqqez

Abdolqader Zahedi (1907–2005) was a high-ranking Sunni religious figure and Iranian Kurdish politician. He received a clerical education and was not a war veteran. He was a member of Iran's Assembly of Experts from 1999 to 2005. He died in Saqqez on December 19, 2005.
