= Gulet =

Type of design of sailing vessel

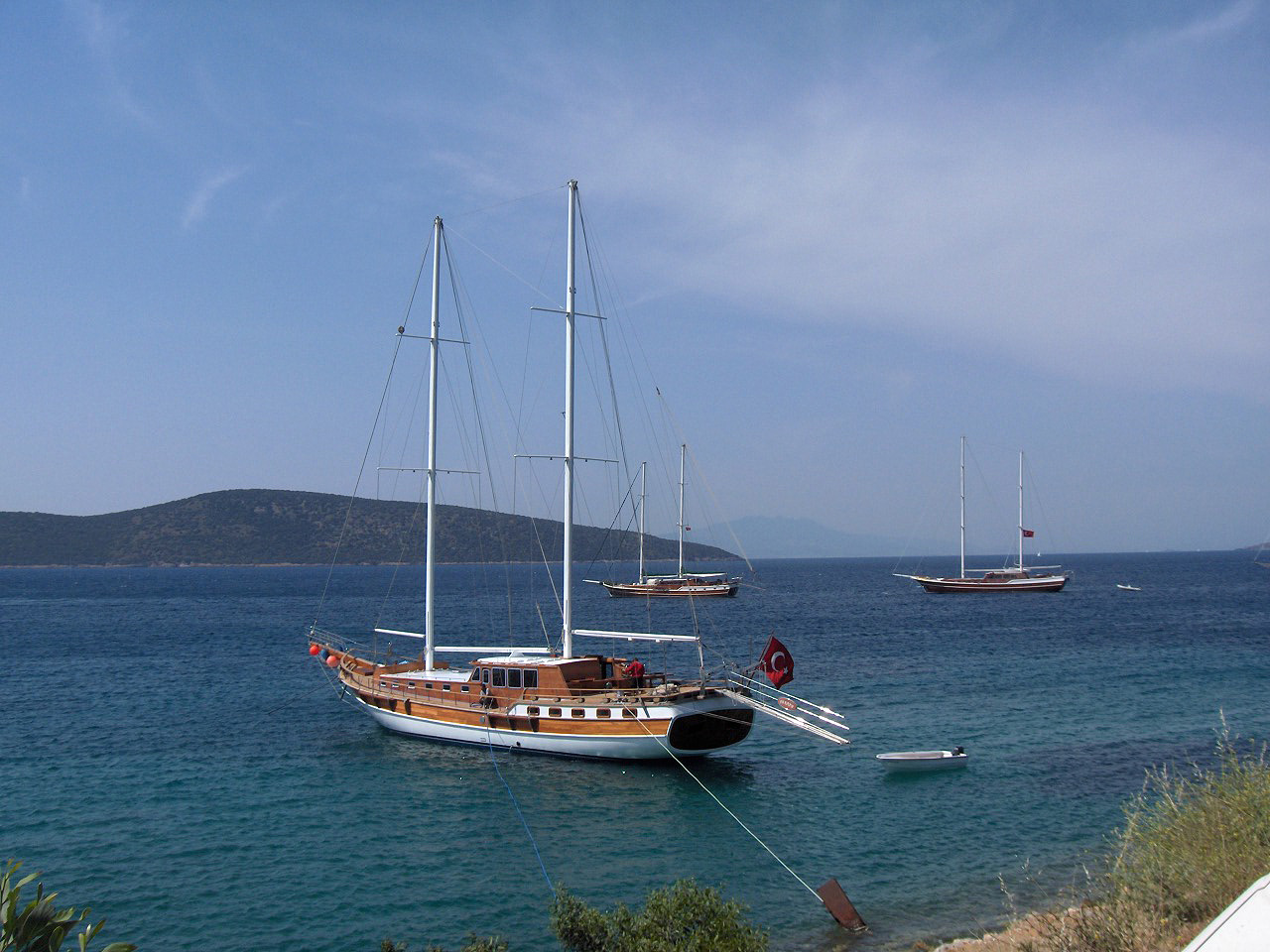
Gulet type schooners near Bodrum

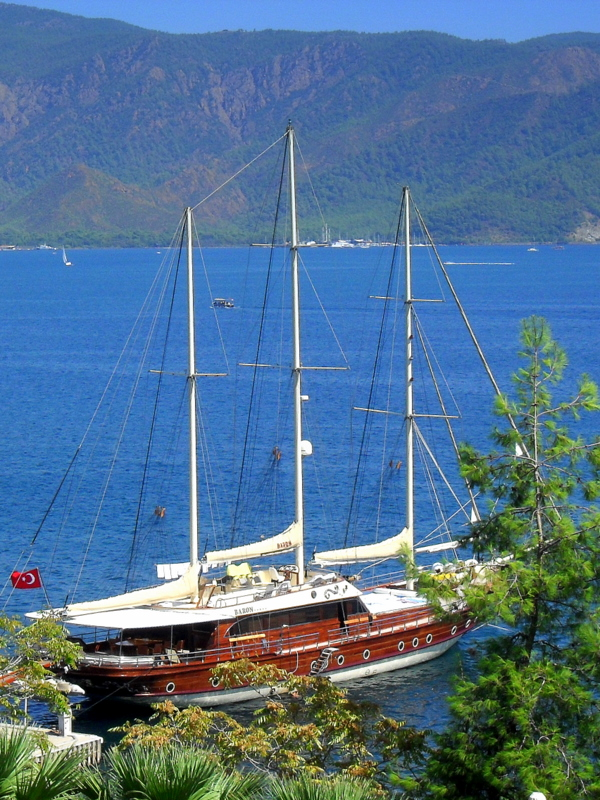
A three-masted example in Marmaris. The most common gulet design has two masts.

A gulet (Turkish pronunciation: [ɡuˈlet]) is a traditional design of a two-masted or three-masted wooden sailing vessel (the most common design has two masts) in Turkey, particularly built in the coastal towns of Bodrum and Marmaris, and may have originated in ancient Ionia with similar vessels found around the eastern Mediterranean. Today, this type of vessel, varying in size from 14 to 35 metres, is popular for tourist charters. For considerations of crew economy, diesel power is now almost universally used, and many are not properly rigged for sailing.

== History ==
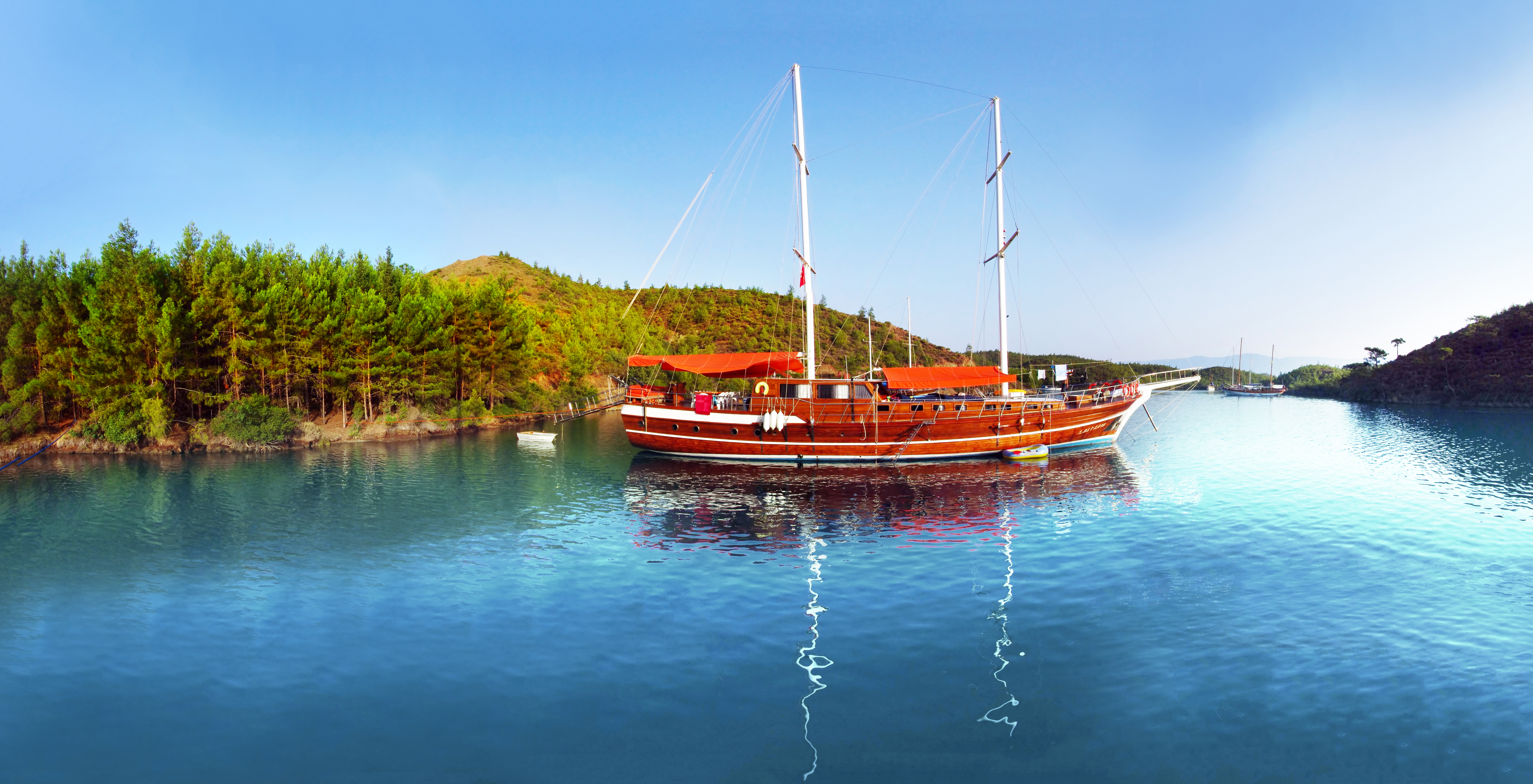
Traditional two-masted gulet visiting a cove in Gökova during a Blue Cruise

There are differing opinions about the history and etymology of gullet which took the Turkish name "gulet" from the Italian word goletta. There is still controversy on whether it originated from the schooner, which has long been used as a sweeping net, trawl net or sponging vessel in Turkey in the Aegean and Mediterranean shores, and as a freight vessel in the Black Sea; or it originates from the fishing vessel guletta (gouëlette or goélette in French), that has come up with the evolution of the word galea or galeotta for the old Italian naval vessels or "goleta" in Spanish. Others have argued that it resembles the American gullet used in line fishing in the Greenland banks, or the clippers carrying goods from India or Australia to England in the periods of colonization.

The evolution of gulet from practical maritime vessels to luxurious yachts traces back to the mid-20th century. The turning point arrived when the exiled Turkish writer, Cevat Sakir Kabaagacli, popularly known as the Fisherman of Halicarnassus, began using gulets for yachting holidays. His explorations coined the term "blue cruise," a name that quickly resonated with the local and international tourism industry.

By the dawn of the 1970s, gulets had become increasingly popular as yachts. Their designs were gradually refined to create more space for relaxation and leisure, in response to the growing demand for gulet cruises. This surge in popularity resulted in a rapid increase in the number of shipyards and workshops building gulets in the region. By the 1980s, gulet cruises, or "blue cruises," became significantly more affordable, paving the way for today's thriving gulet tourism industry.

The origin of the Bodrum-type schooner vessels falls to a nearby date, to the beginning of the 1970s. These types of vessels have come up as a result of the need to carry tourists, who have come in numbers to the Aegean region and especially to Bodrum and Marmaris at the end of the 1960s, to nearby bays. The first samples of the vessels called the Bodrum gulet are seen in those years with the addition to meet that demand of chambers and seating on the back of the deck to the chamberless gulet used in fishing or sponging till those years.

== Etymology ==
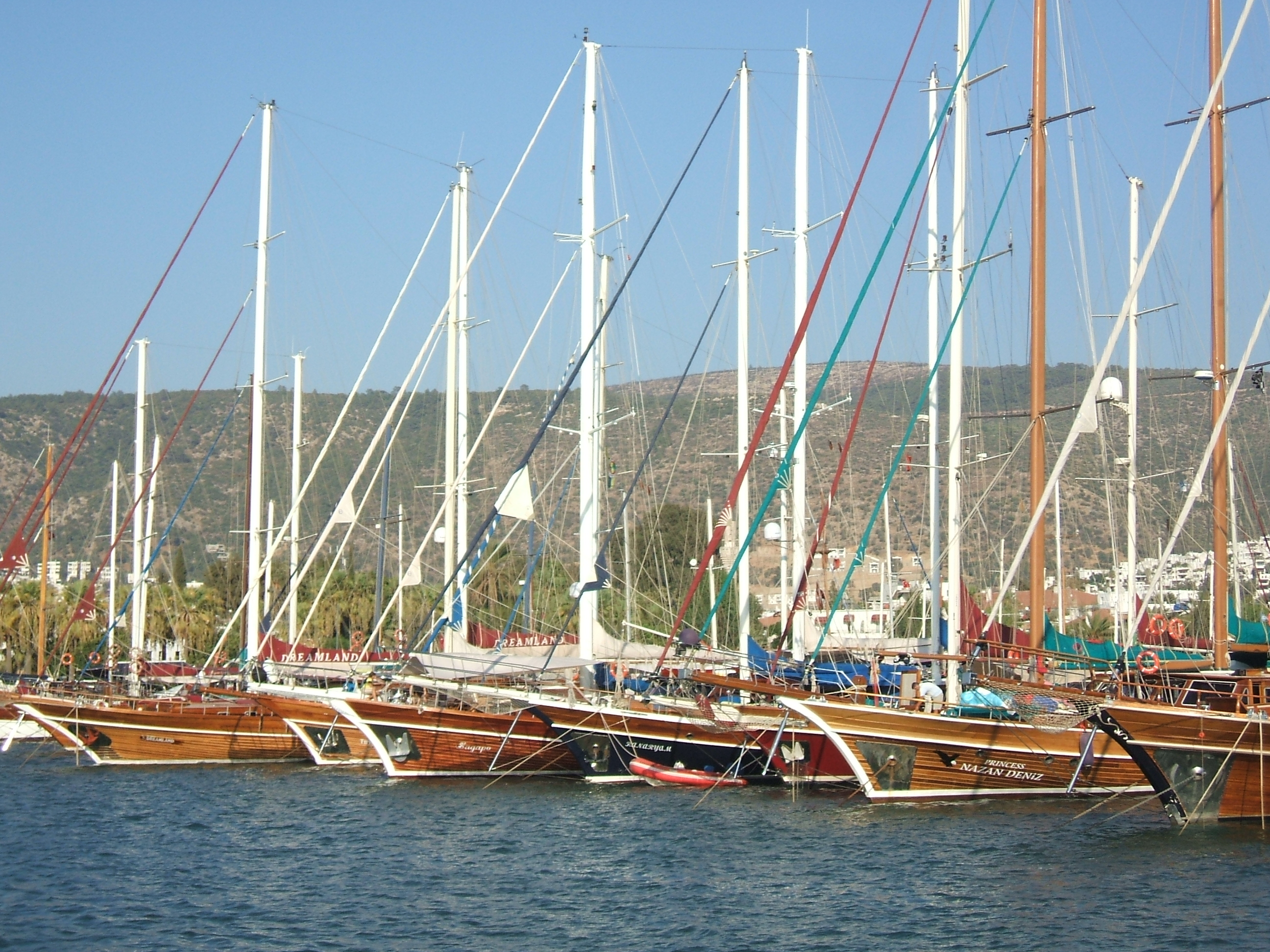
Gulets in Bodrum harbour.

The Turkish word gulet is a loanword from Venetian gołéta (Italian goletta), itself a loanword from French gouëlette (present-day spelling goélette), meaning "schooner". The French word is probably related to goéland, meaning (and etymologically related to the word) "gull", ultimately of Celtic origin.

== Boat construction in Bodrum ==
The boat construction in Bodrum is not a process that started solely with the construction of Gulet. A long construction process has been there starting from antiquity times to the Ottoman times (although with certain interruptions) due to the geographic and historical position of the place. The insufficiency of war hardware such as cannons and shells for the war vessels built in Istanbul within the structure of the main docks opened the search for new production facilities in the second half of the 18th century. New shipyards were constructed in various regions at the turn of the 19th century. In the shipyard in Bodrum, along with those in settlements like Sinop, Gemlik, Rodos, Fatsa and Amasra, galleon construction was started in the beginning of the 19th century.

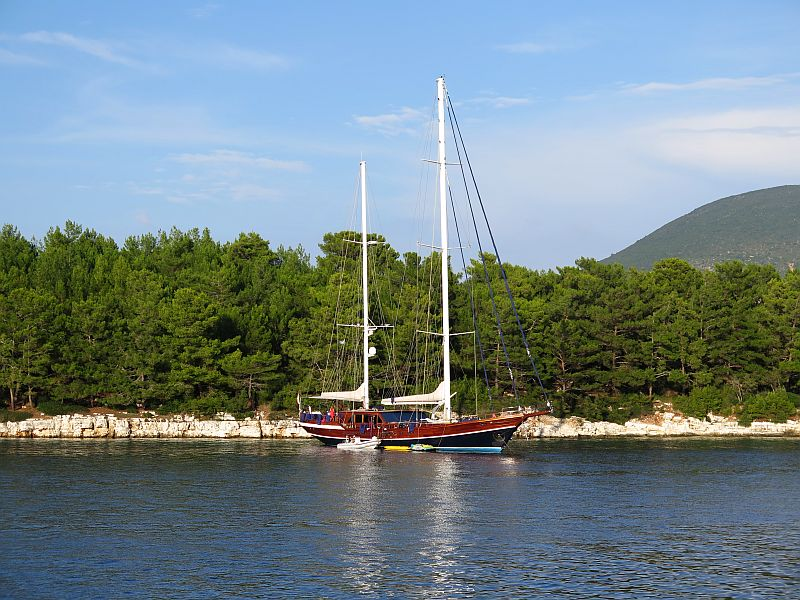
Gulet in Datça, Turkey.

Galleon construction in Bodrum was interrupted in the middle of 19th century, however boat construction continued for use in fishing, sponging, and especially commerce with the islands (till the years 1935–1936). Construction of Bodrum-type Gulet started to meet the demand in parallel to the development of tourism in the beginning of the 1970s. This development caused the growth of the boat construction sector, particularly for the successful schooner examples made by the local boat masters, which increased the interest in such types of boats.

== Types and hull forms ==
The Bodrum gulet is associated with a clipper stem and a rounded stern, a hull form that became characteristic of the luxurious Blue Voyage boats of Bodrum. In contemporary Turkish charter usage, the rounded-stern type is also referred to as karpuz kıç (lit. 'watermelon stern'. A related form is the aynakıç, which has a square or transom stern rather than a rounded stern. Bodrum Maritime Museum describes the aynakıç as another version of the gulet hull, developed for greater capacity and larger deck space. The tırhandil is an older Aegean double-ended boat type; only a small number remain among Blue Voyage boats today. A 2024 study in A/Z ITU Journal of the Faculty of Architecture describes the touristic Bodrum gulet as a relatively modern hull form compared with older traditional boat types such as tırhandils.

== Canadian Motorized Goélettes ==
The basic hull form has been used in the Province of Quebec, Canada for powered wooden goélettes that have been employed in the coastal freight trade. In his 1974 book The Lower St. Lawrence, the historian Ivan S. Brookes included illustrations of motorized wooden goélettes that he photographed on the St. Lawrence River. These included the Riv. Verte at Baie Comeau in 1955; Eric G at La Malbaie Wharf, Murray Bay; the Orleans underway in the Saguenay River; the Rose Helene loading pulpwood at Rivière du Loup, and old goélettes that had been retired from service and abandoned at St. Louis, Ile aux Coudres. Canadian goélettes generally have had the wheelhouse and engine far aft, although the Orleans, evidently a newer vessel, had them located amidships.

A somewhat similar type of small freighter, also wooden but steam powered, and with wheelhouse and engine placed far aft, was built for service on the Great Lakes during the lumber era. Cargoes included lumber, shingles, lath, salt, stone, coal and pig iron. Lake sailors called them "rabbits". Typical examples included the D.F. Rose of 1868, the Charles. Rietz of 1872, the City of Mt. Clemens of 1884 and the Minnie E. Kelton of 1894. Apparently the last survivor of the type was the steamer M. Sicken, built in 1884 at Marine City, Michigan and sold for scrapping in 1937.

The steel fishing trawler Goelette (IMO 7359747) was built in 1974 by Ateliers et Chantiers du Havre at Le Havre, France for service in the South Atlantic. Registered in Namibia, as of 2022 this 690-ton, 164-foot vessel is owned by Gendor Fishing of Walvis Bay, Namibia with Lüderitz as its home port.

== See also ==
- The Blue Voyage
- The Turquoise Coast
- Marinas in Turkey
- Tourism in Turkey

== Sources ==
- Osman Kademoglu "Denizlerin Guzelleri"; Duran Kitap, Istanbul 2000
- Avram Galanti and Arı İnan "Bodrum Tarihi"; BOSAV Yay. Ankara 1996: pp78-79
