= Jordanian political satire =

Political satire in Jordan refers to weekly satirical newspapers, cartoons, prose and online social media that poke fun at the Jordanian government and its politicians. Jordanian satirists use puns and indirect references to tackle taboos, defy restrictive laws that inhibit freedom of speech, and convey public grievances.

== Jordanian early satirists ==
While some might argue that the early accounts of political satire in Jordan can be traced in the works of Jordan's most well-known poet Mustafa Wahbi al-Tal nicknamed ‘Arar’, as he was cynical of the social life during the formative years of Transjordan, satirical writings in Jordan were only made available to the public in the 1960s. According to rare accounts on the history of the Jordanian political satire as found in the diaries of a Jordanian journalist named Faisal Mohammad Awkal, the writings of Fakhri Kawar were the first satirical accounts published in the old newspaper of Amman in the Evening in Arabic (عمان المساء). Qawar's writings included short essays that mainly leveled light criticism at the government. The newspaper, which inspired the later satirical journalism, came to clash with the Jordanian authorities in 1964, after publishing the diaries of Wasfi al-Tal on the 1948 Arab–Israeli War, followed by the diaries of Ahmad Shukeiri resulting in its final shutdown in 1975. Later in early 1980s, Qawar published the first satirical works including Farhan Farah Sae’ed's Diaries (which was adapted as a script for a soap-opera that had the same name mid-1980s), published in 1982, and “I am the Patriarch,” published in 1981.

== Development of satire in 1980s ==
Political satire in Jordan started to develop in the 1980s in the writings of Mohammad Tomaliah, who introduced new elements to the genre in his column in Ad-Dustour, entitled “Eyewitness”. He employed a narrative style borrowed from prose using simplistic realism, cynical discrepancies, and a wide array of unusual similes.

Moreover, Tomaliah used brief sentences that drew clear images of reality and candid portrayals, allowing Jordanian specificities to stand out. He was unconventional and his articles were free of flowery language and clichés. According to critics, Tomaliah was a literary figure and not only a columnist.

In one of his articles, 'The Third Bullet", Tomaliah talks about his life saying:

"I personally have not lived yet, and my life is not yet worthy to write about: All my experiences are trivial although I consider growing up in the southern villages and moving during my adolescence years to live in "Al-Hussein Camp" an experience that gave me a special status: on one hand I am a Jordanian of a Palestinian descent, while on the other, I am Palestinian from a Jordanian origin. Therefore, I frame my political stance within this experience, more specifically within the "Catholic" relationship that govern the two peoples. Also, I do tend to think that my education in Baghdad and my father's death and burial in the beloved 'occupied' capital (in reference to Baghdad) made me an Iraqi: Sunni and Shia at the time time, and a Christian like a cross".

For more than 28 years (until his death in 2008), Tomaliah published hundreds of articles, and several books, which mainly talked and described the miseries of the destitute and the marginalized groups, including the people in his neighborhood in east Amman. Talking about the marginalized groups, Tomaliah breached the norms of the Jordanian journalism, which was formal and conservative when tackling social issues. Tomaliah did what many Jordanian writers would not have done at the time; namely criticizing the society, its norms, its traditions and even himself. It is widely argued among Jordanian critics that Tomaliah's satirical writings and the way they were received encouraged more Jordanian daily newspapers to assign a space for this genre.

In addition to Tomaliah's column, other satire appeared in the Jordanian satirical newspaper of Shihan (newspaper), founded in 1984. The newspaper assigned pages for the editor's satirical writings under the Pseudonym of "Shiho". The newspaper rose to become one of Jordan's most read publications, and despite its satirical nature, it was regarded as one of the most valuable forums for news and public affairs. In 2006, Shihan (newspaper) republished Jyllands-Posten Muhammad cartoons resulting in a public fury that culminated in the dismissal of the paper's editor-in-chief, Jihad al-Momani.

== 1990s- Satire in the era of post-democracy open-up ==
In early 1990s, Jordan held its first parliamentary elections in 22 years, annulled the martial law in effect for 33 years and allowed for the political parties to exist and operate. The new era promised the emergence of liberal media and art represented in a theatrical boom in the country which coincided with the arrival of hundreds of thousands of Palestinians who fled Kuwait after the Gulf War in 1991.

In 1993,Nabil Sawalha and Hisham Yanes, who returned to Jordan from Kuwait after the war, established Nabil &Hisham theater where they staged several successful plays including Ahlan Barlman (Welcome, Parliament), Ahlan Nizam A'lami Jadid (Welcome, New World Order), Ahaln Mo'tamar Qimma Arabyia (Welcome, Arab Summit) and Ahlan Tatbee' (Welcome, Normalization).

Nabil and Hisham's plays established the phenomenon in Jordanian satire of being able to escape state censorship and being the first Jordanian comedians to ridicule and imitate Arab leaders on an Arab stage. The two comedians viewed their career as being free of dangers, believing there was a margin of freedom at the time, and that they needed to filter their language on certain occasions.

In one of their plays: “Welcome, New World Order”, which came in the aftermath of the Gulf War in 1990, the duo presented a rare Arab perspective at what the new order promised back then. Both Hisham Yanes and Nabil Sawalha used symbolism and implicit language, which at times lacked clarity, when referring to sensitive issues. They were mainly attempting to test the limits of tolerance provided after Jordan's abolition of the martial law in 1989. The play which continued for 20 months attracted late King Hussein whose attendance limited future censorship.

Under the democratic opening-up, a satirical newspaper was published mid-1990s. In 1996, Abed Rabbo weekly newspaper was launched by the satirist Yousef Ghishan and sold in the first weeks thousands of copies. In 1997 and after an amended version of the press and publication law was endorsed, the paper closed, unable to meet the requirements and fines stipulated by the law.

== Press and publication law in 1997 ==
After the short-lived period of media freedom, the cabinet of Abdelsalam al-Majali introduced to the 1993 press and publication law new censorship measures. Under the new amendments, the Press and Publication Department (PPD) was given more powers to regulate the publications and the press, and the PPD was authorized to exercise censorship over the publications allowing it and the government to have an ultimate control over all media bodies.

The law also increased the minimum capital required to issue newspapers. The law also prohibited the publication of rumors or false information and any news or material that might be harmful to national unity and any material that encouraged public strikes and dissent.

In 1998, the Parliament endorsed the Press and Publications Law No. 18 of 1998, which was viewed as almost identical to the law of 1997. In 1999, the government, presented a draft amendment to the Press and Publications Law of 1998 to the Parliament. The amended law of 1999 annulled several restrictions provided for in the law of 1998, reduced the required minimum capital required for weekly newspapers.

This law led to the suspension of several leading privately owned newspapers, the majority of which were law-budgeted, such as Abed Rabbo, Hawadeth Al-Sa'a, among others that failed to comply with this prerequisite. Despite the subsequent amendments, the law remained largely the same, and under it only official media dominated the scene.

== Satirical cartoons ==
Cartoons in Jordan serve as powerful tool to express political views. Emad Hajjaj, is considered a pioneer in drawing satirical cartoons portraying Jordanian political figures, including the King himself. Hajjaj's most famous cartoon character (Abu Mahjoob) made its debut in 1993 portraying an angry Jordanian man hanging a promotional sign for the elections, which read "No to foreign labor" while at the same time yelling at an Egyptian worker to help him fix it.

In 1999, Hajjaj drew an unprecedented cartoon when he portrayed King Abdullah II disguised as an ordinary citizen, in a way to show Jordanians to be aware of the new monarch's way of watching things over. Being the first time to depict the monarch, the cartoon raised questions about the extent to which can Hajjaj push the boundaries of satire in Jordan. And While it is a criminal offence to insult the king and the royal family in Jordan, Hajjaj's cartoons were not seen as ridiculing the monarch."

Through thousands of his cartoons, Hajjaj has tackled numerous political as well as social problems in Jordan. He has also critiqued several Jordanian prime ministers and poked fun at the parliament. Several of Hajjaj's cartoons were banned, including many controversial depictions of the post-Arab Spring demonstrations, one of them was published online under the headline of the Dabkeh Al-Islah or the Reform Dance, in which Abu Mahjoob warns dabkeh dancers against performing the Ali Baba dance and instead to choose any other mythical characters, such as Sinbad or Scheherazade. Ali Baba is a nickname that activists in the post-Arab spring demonstrations used to refer to King Abdullah II who, according to them, along with forty thieves, stole the country's assets.

Another cartoon by Hajjaj that raised controversy was about the escape of a convicted businessman from jail. In 2011 and as the Jordanian public was pressing for a serious corruption fight, officials helped facilitate the escape of a Jordanian official and a businessman, Khaled Shaheen, who was detained over involvement in corruption cases. On that's subject, Hajjaj drew a cartoon in which his main characters discuss the escape of Shaheen, saying the government opens corruption files but the same time opens the prison doors.

== Satire in Jordan after 2000 ==
Satirical columns instead of newspapers

With the introduction of laws restricting media freedoms and that forced weekly newspaper to halt publication, Jordanian satirists found their way into daily columns published in Jordan's leading daily newspapers, such as Al Ra'i, Ad-Dustor, and Al Arab Al Yawm (newspaper). Among the most prominent names that became popular in Jordan since 2000 are Ahmad Hasan Al Zoubi, Kamel Nusairat, Yousef Ghishan, and Ahmad Abu Khalil, among others.

Given the rapid dissemination of their articles via social media, Jordanian columnists have become effective in shaping the public opinion in a subtle way. For instance, Ahmad Hasan Al Zoubi, who writes for Al Ra'i newspaper, has gained fame for his sarcastic writings that have attracted the attention of Jordanians. His style can be best characterized as simple but indirect, hiding bitter criticism of the political, economic and social scene in the country.

In one of Al Zoubi's most famous articles that raised awareness on a local issue that has not yet been resolved, Jordanians found a voice of reason that employed simple language with a cynical tone to address a serious topic: The establishment of a nuclear reactor. In an article titled "Why do we reject the nuclear reactor?", Al Zoubi refutes the government's narrative on the guaranteed success of the nuclear reactor as a new energy source. He addresses the officials in charge of project by simply telling them that Jordanians do not have faith in them. Al Zoubi refers to the statements of president of the Jordan Atomic Energy Commission defending the scheme and trying to assure Jordanians that what happened to Japan's nuclear reactor of Fukushima Daiichi Nuclear Power Plant cannot happen in Jordan as it was a ‘Japanese’ administrative mistake. Al Zoubi cunningly argues that if the Japanese given their long expertise in the field committed mistakes, why would Jordanians, given their zero experience, be immune? Al Zoubi's argument was widely circulated via Facebook and played a role in shedding light on the potential danger of the reactor. The wide circulation of his articles encouraged Al Zoubi to publish two collections of articles in books. The first was Sawaleif (Stories) in 2006 and the second was Al-Mam'out (The Featherless Bird) in 2008.

Prior to Al Zoubi's collections of articles published in form of a book, Jordan's leading satirist Mohammad Tomaliah published two collections in 2004 and 2007. The first was Yahduth Le Doun Sa'r Al Nas (“Happens to me among all people”) and contained selected cartoons drawn by Emad Hajjaj. The second was Ilayhā bi-ṭabī’at al-ḥāl - nuṣūṣ khādishah lil-ḥiyād al-‘āmm (“To her as a matter of course -- texts that breach public neutrality”).

By choosing the sub-title Nusus Khadishah lil-hiyad al-‘amm (texts that breach public neutrality) (a play on words, instead of the familiar combination ‘public modesty’), Tomaliah, attempted to deviate from the Jordanian mainstream literature. In his book, which takes the form of short articles and stories, Tomaliah alludes to local and Arab political failures. In one of the book's articles titled “Fig Leaf”, Tomaliah reduces the vast areas of the Arab lands to a fig leaf that does not hide the Arab countries' defects. He critiques the fake borders that separate the 'one Arab homeland' as ones that result in 'border' grudges that disturb the brotherly ties, adding that:

"The borders are often located in the desert, which in case of chaos, issues such as "sovereignty", expulsion of ambassadors, closure of checkpoints and demands to re-draft borders result in the arrival of scientists wearing khaki shorts and caps accompanied by beautiful women on top of Jeep cars. Those who drafted the borders in the past come from all over to draw them again. Each country strives to acquire a new piece of 'wilderness' and you will never understand why those are so keen to expand their area in a 'homeland' where humans cannot afford a piece of cloth to patch their robes, not even with a 'fig leaf'"

== Post-Arab Spring satire ==
Al'an Fahimtkum

The title of the play is inspired by the famous statement of the deposed Tunisian president: Now I Understand You. It is written by Ahmad Hasan Al Zoubi and Musa Hijazeen takes the leading role in the play as Abu Saqer, a dictator Jordanian father whose wife and children decide to rebel against him in the wake of the Arab Spring. The play includes scenes that shed light on pressing Jordanian issues such as corruption, public land acquisition by the regime, the way cabinets are formed in Jordan, national unity, and the outcomes of the national dialogue committee (formed in 2011 to undertake constitutional amendments). The play is a hallmark in the post-2011 Jordanian political satire, as it has crossed red-lines on things that are not usually talked about in Jordanian public arena.

Kharabeesh animations and stand-up comedies

Kharabeesh, a Jordanian company that has produced animated cartoons since 2008, increased its productions after 2011. The company based in Jabal Amman hosted dozens of Jordanian and Arab amateur stand-comedians who performed in videos that addressed social and political issues. Kharabeesh introduced new young names to the Jordanian satire including Rajae Qawas, Nicolas Khouri and Laith Al Abbadi, who made notable appearance on Kharabeesh YouTube channel of N2O comedy.

Roya TV After the establishment of Roya TV, a liberal TV channel, young Jordanian comedians found a new platform and space to speak about their opinions on local and regional political issues. The recently banned TV show 7aki Jarayed or “The talk of newspapers” discussed the issues of refugees, elections, poverty, Israel and peace process, Jordanian identity, reform and citizenship. The show distinguished itself by broadcasting reports that interview ordinary Jordanian people asking them about their opinion regarding rising political issues. The show was recently banned due to use of profanity, according to the administration of Roya TV.
