= Osama Hajjaj =

Jordanian cartoonist (born 1973)

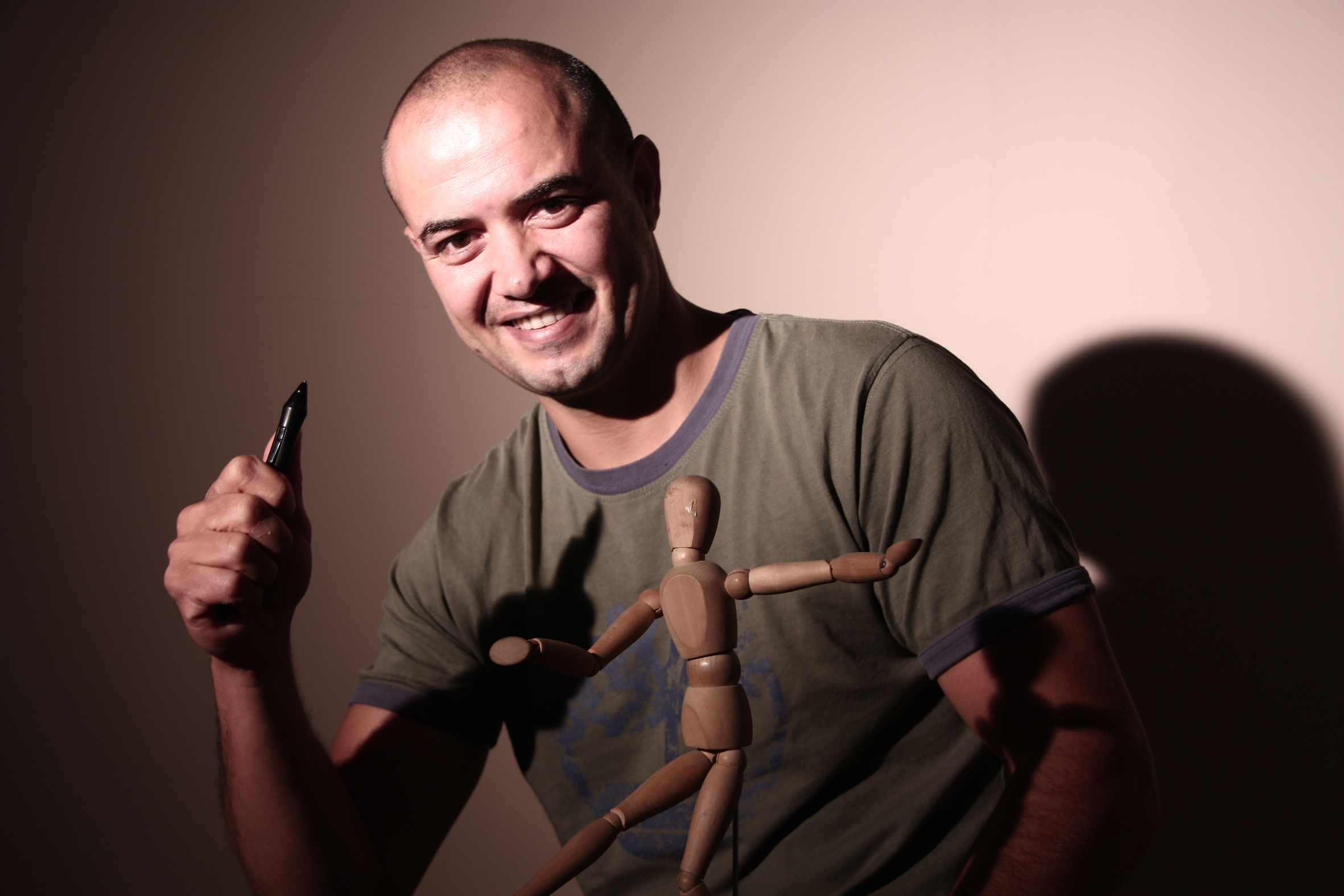
- Born: January 9, 1973 (age 52); Amman, Jordan
- Known for: Political cartoons and caricatures
- Website: Osama Hajjaj Official website

Osama Eid Hajjaj (Arabic: أسامة حجاج) is a Palestinian-Jordanian cartoonist, born in Amman in 1973.

== Life and career ==
Osman Hajjaj was born in Amman, Jordan in 1973. He has worked for various daily newspapers in Jordan, such as Ad-Dustour and Al Ra'i, and weekly newspapers such as Al-Bilad and Al-Mar'aa; he worked for Al-Ittihad, the Emirati newspaper. Currently, he works in Al Arab Al Yawm (newspaper) and publishes his cartoons in several regional and international web-sites, such as Cagle Cartoons. and http://www.cartoonmovement.com/.

Osama is the brother of Emad Hajjaj, who is also a cartoonist. The brothers are acutely aware of the challenges involved in publishing political cartoons in the Middle East. Both have been victims of intimidation, have received death threats on account of their satirical work, especially cartoons directed at ISIS. Osama claims that he was jailed for one of his cartoons.

== Work ==
He is best known for his political cartoons and caricatures, many of which have appeared in texts and monographs and in popular magazines such as France's Charlie Hebdo.

== See also ==
- Jordanian art
- Omaya Joha
