= Jalal Barjas =

Jordanian literary writer (born 1970)

- Born: 3 June 1970 (age 56); Madaba, Jordan
- Occupations: Literary writer, journalist
- Writing career
- Language: Arabic English
- Notable awards: Katara Prize for Arabic Novel; International Prize for Arabic Fiction

Jalal Barjas (also written Jalal Barjes or Jalal Bargas; Arabic: جلال برجس; b. 1970) is a Jordanian literary author and journalist, writing in Arabic. A trained engineer, he worked as a newspaper editor and a journalist and has published in a range of genres, including poetry, short stories, novels, and literary articles.

== Life and journalistic career ==
Barjas was born in 1970 in the village of Hanina, near Madaba, Jordan. He studied aeronautical engineering and worked in this field for years before starting with the Jordanian press as an editor in the Al-Anbat newspaper and later as a reporter for al-Dustour. He also worked as managing editor for a number of cultural magazines, such as Madaba and Pioneers. He is now Head of the Jordanian Narrative Lab, and Editor-in-Chief of generation sound magazine. he Prepares and presents a cultural radio program entitled House of Novel . He writes cultural articles in a number of Arab newspapers and magazines.

== Literary work and distinction ==
Among his books are two poetry collections Like Any Branch On A Tree (2008) and A Moon Without tracks (2011); a short story collection entitled The Earthquakes (2012); and the novels Guillotine of the Dreamer, Snakes of Hell, and Women of the Five Senses, the last of which was longlisted for the International Prize for Arabic Fiction (IPAF) in 2019. Thereafter, his most recent novel, Notebooks of the Bookseller (2021), would win the IPAF in 2021.

In 2015, he won the Katara Prize for Arabic Novel for his Snakes of Fire, the Rifqa Doudin prize for his novel Guillotine of the Dreamer, and the Rukus ibn Za'id al Uzayzi prize for his short fiction,The Earthquakes.

In 2021, his novel Notebooks of the Bookseller won the IPAF. During the award ceremony, Lebanese poet Chawki Bazih, speaking as chairperson of the judges' panel, stated the following about Barjas' work:

In intensely poetic language, Jordanian writer Jalal Barjas throws light on a totally schizophrenic reality in his country, which lies on a fault line prone to frequent tremors. His hero, Ibrahim al-Warraq, is a newspaper seller who has been forced out of the city centre but decides against suicide after meeting a mysterious woman who shares his desperation. However, he continues to seek death in other ways.After losing his job and refuge, Ibrahim decides to live with the homeless people in his city and, assuming the identities of the heroes of the novels he has read, he becomes a professional thief who robs banks and the very wealthy, in order to help the abject poor and impose his own form of justice like Robin Hood. As events unfold, Barjas opens up many surprises for his reader, illustrating through his flawed characters the ruined state and complete emptiness of the world. He uses all the tools of emotional stress and engagement and of psychological exploration of human behaviour that narration necessitates.

— Chawki Bazih, IPAF Prize 2021 for "Notebooks of the Booksellers" by Jalal Bargas, International Prize for Arabic Fiction 2021
