= Hiba Abu Taha =

Jordanian investigative journalist

- هبة أبوطه
- Born: Ain Al-Basha, Balqa Governorate, Jordan
- Occupation: Journalist
- Criminal charges: Inciting discord and strife among members of society Targeting community peace and inciting violence
- Criminal penalty: 9 months imprisonment
- Criminal status: Released

Hiba Abu Taha (Arabic: هبة أبوطه) is a Jordanian freelance investigative journalist. In 2024, she became the first journalist to be convicted under 2023 cybercrime law after publishing two articles criticising the Jordanian government's actions during the Gaza war.

== Biography ==
Abu Taha is from Ain Al-Basha, Balqa Governorate, and is of Palestinian descent. Through her work as a freelance investigative journalist, she has contributed to various news outlets, including Jordan Today, Al Jazeera, and Daraj.

== Arrests and trials ==
=== August 2020 arrest ===
In August 2020, Abu Taha was arrested on charges of slander and undermining the government following a 2012 interview she had given with the Associated Press during widespread protests in Jordan against rising gas and fuel prices. She was found innocent and released after one week in detention.

=== August 2023 arrest and trial ===
In August 2023, Abu Taha was briefly detained after publishing an article on Facebook in which she criticised the King of Jordan, Abdullah II, for his normalisation of ties with Israel. Abu Taha was charged with "defaming an official institution" under article 191 of the Jordanian penal code, and was sentenced to three months' imprisonment in addition to a fine. Abu Taha was critical of the sentence, stating that the Jordanian royal family did not constitute a state institution, citing article 195 of the penal code which specifically criminalised defamation of the king. Abu Taha was released from detention after successfully appealing the verdict.

=== October 2023 arrest and trial ===
In October 2023, Abu Taha faced criminal charges after publishing an article alleging that Jordanian hotels were hosting Israeli settlers. In September 2024, she was sentenced to a fine of 5000 JOD.

=== April 2024 arrest, trial and imprisonment ===
In April 2024, Abu Taha published two articles on the Lebanese news outlet Annasher. The first, published on 22 April, criticised Jordanian authorities for intercepting Iranian drones and rockets launched against Israel earlier that month. The second article, which was published on 28 April and entitled "Partners in genocide: Jordanian capital involved in genocide in the Gaza Strip", alleged that Jordanian authorities were permitting regional companies to ship goods to Israel via the UAE–Israel land corridor at the Jordanian-Israeli border at the Jordan River Crossing and the Wadi Araba Crossing during the Red Sea crisis, in which the Houthis in Yemen started attacking ships in the Red Sea and Arabian Sea of vessels headed to Israel. Bisher Khasawneh, the Prime Minister of Jordan, had previously described reports on the existence of land bridges between Jordan and Israel as a "fabrication".

Following the publication of the articles, the Media Commission of Jordan filed an official complaint against Abu Taha. She was arrested on 14 May 2024 while driving in Ain Al-Basha, and was detained at various detention centres before being transferred to a prison in Al-Jweideh. On 28 May, a bail request made by Abu Taha's legal team was denied.

On 11 June 2024 at the Soloh Court in Amman, Abu Taha was sentenced to one year in prison for "inciting discord and strife among members of society" and "targeting community peace and inciting violence" under article 15 of the cybercrime law. Abu Taha was the first journalist to be jailed under the cybercrime law. She was ordered to serve her sentence at the prison in Al-Jweideh; the sentence equated to nine months' imprisonment due to the official length of the prison year.

On 23 June 2024, Abu Taha's appeal was rejected by the Appellate Court, which upheld her sentence without holding a hearing. Decisions by appellate courts are final in the Jordanian legal system.

On 10 February 2025, ahead of the end of Abu Taha's sentence, Abu Taha's lawyer raised concerns that her release may be delayed as she was unable to pay the court-ordered fine of 5000 JOD. The money was subsequently raised following a fundraiser held by journalists and activists, and Abu Taha was released from prison after serving her sentence.

== Response ==
=== National ===
The Centre for Defending Freedom of Journalists, a Jordanian non-governmental organisation, expressed its "deep concern" at the decision of the Soloh Court and the Appellate Court, and warned that there needed to be an urgent review of the cybercrime law and its implications for journalism and freedom of expression.

The Jordanian Democratic Popular Unity Party issued a statement denouncing Abu Taha's imprisonment and described her investigative journalism as part of her right to freedom of expression enshrined in the Jordanian constitution.

In October 2024, "We stand in solidarity with Hiba Abu Taha", an online campaign, was launched by 24 human rights organisations.

Bashir al-Momani, the Jordanian media commissioner, released a statement following Abu Taha's conviction describing her articles as containing "serious insults against Jordanian state institutions, incitement to the state's positions, and stirring up discord among the components of the people".

=== International ===
The Committee to Project Journalists called on Jordanian authorities to immediately and unconditionally drop the charges against Abu Taha and to allow her to report on the Gaza war without fear of reprisal. It additionally described authorities' use of the cybercrime law as "reeking of censorship". The International Press Institute "strongly condemned" Abu Taha's sentence and urged the Appellate Court to overturn the conviction, in addition to calling on the Jordanian government to repeal the cybercrime law.

The Coalition for Women in Journalism criticised Abu Taha's arrest and sentence and described the cybercrime law as "draconian", expressing solidarity with Abu Taha and other journalists. Women Journalists Without Chains welcomed Abu Taha's release from prison, and called for the immediate repeal of the cybercrime law.

On 18 December 2024, the MENA Rights Group submitted a general allegation to the United Nations Special Procedures of the Human Rights Council concerning the government crackdown on pro-Palestinian activists in Jordan, including Abu Taha.
