= Ain Al-Basha =

- Populated place
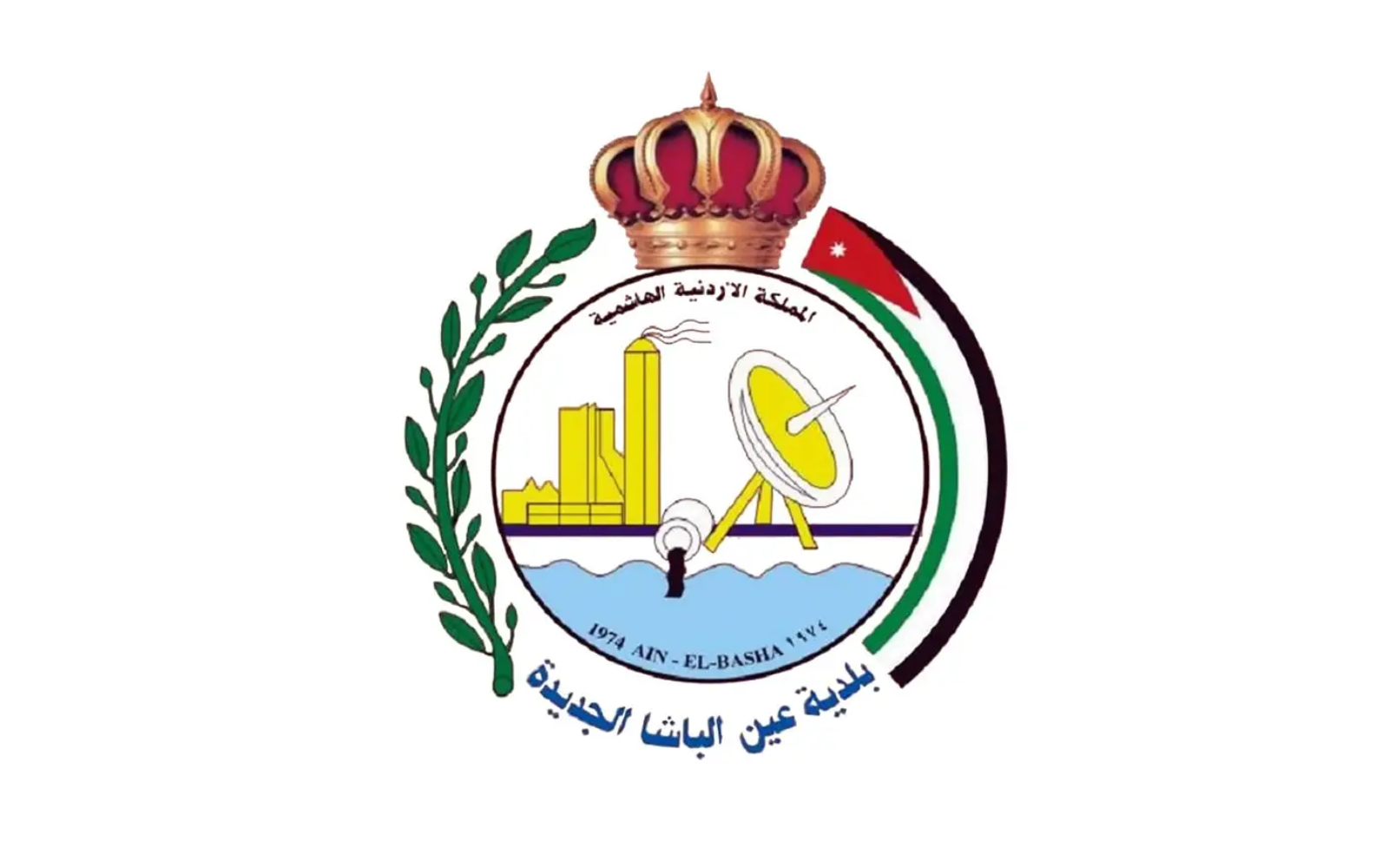
- Flag

- Location in Jordan
- Coordinates: 32°03′36″N 35°49′51″E
- PAL: 228/163
- Country: Jordan
- Governorate: Balqa
- District: Ain Al Basha

Ain Al-Basha is a Jordanian town in Balqa Governorate, located about 20 kilometers northwest of the capital, Amman. Highway 35, which connects Amman with Jerash, runs through Ain Al-Basha.

The Baqa'a refugee camp, which was set up in 1968 and is the largest Palestinian refugee camp in Jordan, is located near Ain Al-Basha. It was one of six camps set up to shelter refugees fleeing from the Palestinian territories during the 1967 Arab–Israeli war.

== Name ==
Pasha, pronounced "Basha" in Arabic, is a Turkish title that was granted to senior military personnel and those with high civil positions, meaning the head or the president. Ain al-Basha was called by this name because Ibrahim Pasha went to a well, or "ain", while passing through the area.

== Population ==
The population of Ain Al-Basha was estimated at 69,716 in 2021. Its neighborhoods include Prince Ali, Qutaiba, Al-Balad, Al-Zahra, Umm Safatin, Western Shuwaihi, and Imam Al-Shafi’i.

== Education ==
There are a number of government schools for both sexes from elementary to high school and in various academic branches and 12 kindergartens for children and 9 nursery centers and more than 15 private schools, the most famous of which are Al Majd, Sama Amman, creativity and achievement schools.

There is near the Ain Al-Basha Philadelphia University (Jordan) on the road to Jerash and the Applied Science Private University in Shafa Badran, east of Ain Al-Basha; in addition to Al-Ahliyya Amman University to the southwest of Ain Al-Basha.

== Notable residents ==
- Hiba Abu Taha, journalist.
