= Government of Dubai Media Office =

- Government of Dubai Media Office Logo

Agency overview
- Formed: 2010
- Jurisdiction: Government of Dubai
- Headquarters: Dubai, United Arab Emirates
- Agency executive: Mona Ghanem Al Marri, Director General
- Child agencies: Dubai Press Club; Brand Dubai
- Website: mediaoffice.ae

The Government of Dubai Media Office (GDMO) is an entity which is part of the Dubai government. It is responsible for implementing strategic communication plans for the Government of Dubai as well as disseminating government-related news in cooperation with local government agencies. It was established in 2010 under Law No (2) of 2010 issued by the ruler of Dubai, Sheikh Mohammed bin Rashid Al Maktoum and in 2013 there was a major restructuring.

== History ==
The GDMO was established to handle the media affairs of the ruling family of Dubai, and over the years its role expanded towards PR and news production leading up to it being officially established as a Government entity in 2010.

== Corporate structure and sub-entities ==
The Director General of the GDMO is Mona Ghanem Al Marri, under which there are 7 departments and 2 sub entities: The Dubai Press Club and Brand Dubai.

=== Sub-entities ===
==== Dubai Press Club ====
An association for Journalists and media professionals founded in November 1999 by Mohammed bin Rashid Al Maktoum and was based in Dubai Media City in Dubai, United Arab Emirates. It launched the Arab Media Forum and the Arab Journalism Award. In 2010, it was merged under DGMO.

==== Brand Dubai ====
Brand Dubai is a newly formed initiative which is the creative arm of the GDMO, it has role in beautifying the city through public art projects and events like Dubai Canvas. Brand Dubai also organizes campaigns and events which include the Dubai Metro Music Festival and the #DubaiDestinations initiative.

== Headquarters ==
The GDMO is based in Convention Tower at the Dubai World Trade Center in the city of Dubai, United Arab Emirates. In 2020, the GDMO moved to new offices in the Offices 2, One Central at the Dubai World Trade Centre.

== Services and Activities ==
The GDMO mainly serves the affairs of the ruling family of Dubai and the Dubai Government, but creating and distributing various content through multiple media platforms.
