= Ahmad Hasan Al Zoubi =

Jordanian columnist And Satirist

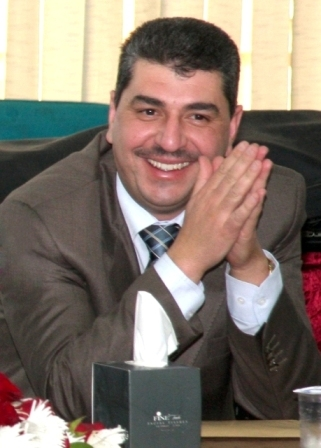
Ahmad Hasan Al Zoubi in 2011

Ahmad Hasan Al Zoubi or Al Zu’bi (Arabic: أحمد حسن الزعبي) is a Jordanian playwright. He rose to prominence in 2004 after he started to write his weekly column in state-owned newspaper Al Ra'i. The column titled “Sawaleif”, in English “parables” became on the most read columns in Jordan as the writer cynically addresses political and social problems.

Al Zoubi was born in 1975 in the Jordanian border town of Ar-Ramtha north of Jordan and is a member of the Hasanite Al-Zoubi family. He earned a BA in accounting from Jerash Private University in 1998. While at the university, he won several awards on national level for writing short stories.

== Career ==
Al Zoubi worked in sales in a company in the United Arab Emirates. He started his writing career in the Emirati magazine of Ahwal under a satirical column entitled “the other street” from 2000 to 2003. He also published several articles in Al-Khaleej magazine. He came back to Jordan in 2004 and started writing for Al Ra'i newspaper under a satirical column entitled “Sawaleif”, an Arabic word for parables or short stories.

In 2008, Al Zoubi started his website Sawalief, which publishes his banned articles and the works of Jordanian amateur writers. In 2011 and in the wake of Arab Spring, he wrote the famous play of Al'an Fahimtkum, which he described as a work that 300 million Arabs wrote. In 2012, Al Zoubi started cooperation with Kharabeesh which produces his satirical program of Mon3 fe al-Seen, in Arabic “Banned in China”. Al Zoubi shas also written for Emarat Al Youm newspaper since 2012.

On July 2, 2024, Al Zoubi was arrested and sentenced to one year in prison and fined 50 dinars for a post on Facebook he had made 11 months earlier, which was found to be in violation of the country's new Cybercrime law. In the post, Al Zoubi had criticized the government’s position on a controversial December 2022 transportation workers’ strike. Al-Zoubi was convicted under Jordan’s Cybercrime Law of “the crime of performing an act that led to provoking conflict between the elements of the nation.” On January 16, 2025, he was released and his sentence was commuted to a community service penalty.

== Published works ==
- Sawalief (parables) 2006
- Al-Mam’out (The featherless bird) 2008
- Awja’ Watan (The pains of the homeland) 2012
- Solo Bleeding 2012

== Plays ==
- The political satirical play Al'an Fahimtkum
