= Shihan (disambiguation) =

Shihan is a Japanese title for a master of martial arts

Shihan may also refer to:

- Shihan (newspaper), Jordanian weekly newspaper named after a mountain
- Shihan, single hill that stands out in the landscape, named after chalk formations between Volga and Ural Mountains

Shihan is also a given name, especially among Sri Lankans. People with the name Shihan include:

- Shihan Mihiranga Bennet, Sri Lankan singer
