= Emad Hajjaj =

Palestinian-Jordanian artist

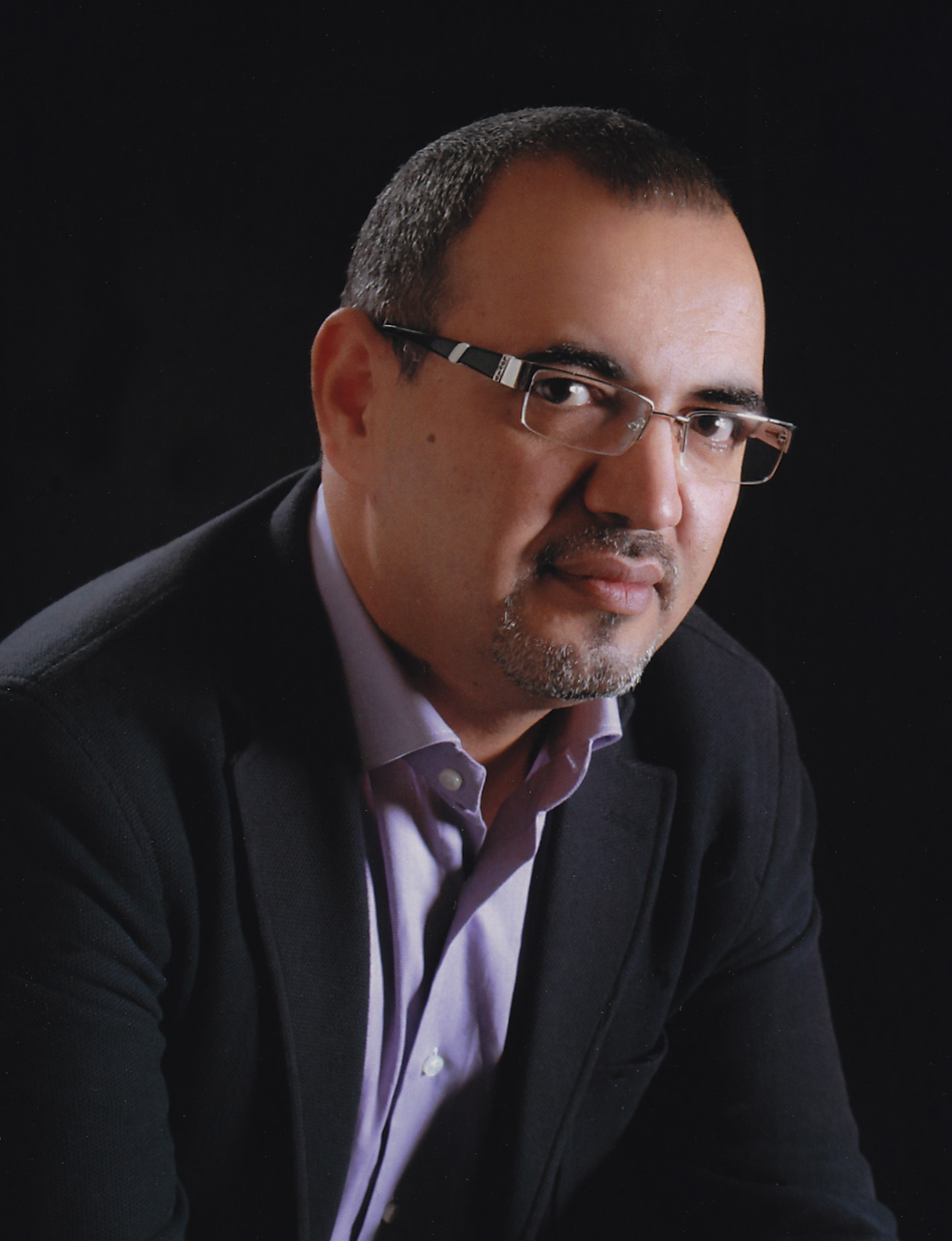
- Born: 1967 (age 58–59); West Bank, Jordan
- Education: Bachelor of Fine Arts, Yarmouk University
- Known for: drawing caricatures
- Website: www.hajjajcartoons.com

Emad Hajjaj (Arabic: عماد حجاج) is a Palestinian-Jordanian editorial cartoonist. He is best known for his work in Al Ra'i and the Jordan Times daily newspapers.

== Early life ==
Emad was born in Jordan's West Bank in 1967. He received his art education at Yarmouk University graduating with a Bachelor of Arts in 1991 after majoring in graphic design and with a minor in journalism.

== Career ==
Emad is the brother of Osama Hajjaj who is also a cartoonist and political caricaturist. The brothers are actually aware of the challenges involved in publishing political cartoons in strife-torn Middle East. Both have been victims of intimidation and have received death threats on account of their satirical work, especially for cartoons directed at ISIS.

During the Pan Arab games held in Amman, Emad published a cartoon which pointed out the irony that a nation could be proud when it allowed honor killings to continue. In 2008, an exhibition of his work, featuring 100 drawings was held at the city hall of Ra's al-'Ayn, and he was a contributor to the Lighting Lamps exhibition which was sponsored by the British Council.

== Arrest ==
On 26 August 2020, Emad was arrested in Jordan under the cybercrime law after publishing a caricature criticising the Israel–United Arab Emirates peace agreement. The drawing depicted a UAE political leader, the crown prince of Abu Dhabi, holding a white peace dove on which is painted the Israeli flag. The crown prince is visibly upset at the pigeon for spitting on his face. The caption on top reads: "Israel asks USA to not sell F-35 warplanes to the UAE". On the spit the letters "Spit 35" are read.

Local journalists' rights centres called for Emad's immediate release.

Emad was released four days later, following his bail by the Jordanian Journalists Syndicate.

== Abu Mahjoob Character ==

Hajjaj created the cartoon character Abu Mahjoob (Arabic: أبو محجوب) in 1993, and has gained in popularity in Jordan since then. Abu Mahjoob represents the common Jordanian man and portrays his every day political, social, and cultural concerns. He wears a pinstripe suit and necktie along with a red keffiyeh and agal, and sports a crooked moustache.

Emad Hajjaj first drew Abu Mahjoob in 1993 as a character who hung candidate posters in the Jordanian parliamentary election that year. Hajjaj based the character on his father in terms of his witty and ironic humor.

== See also ==
- Palestinian art
- Omaya Joha
