= Z (cartoonist) =

Tunisian caricaturist and activist

_Z_
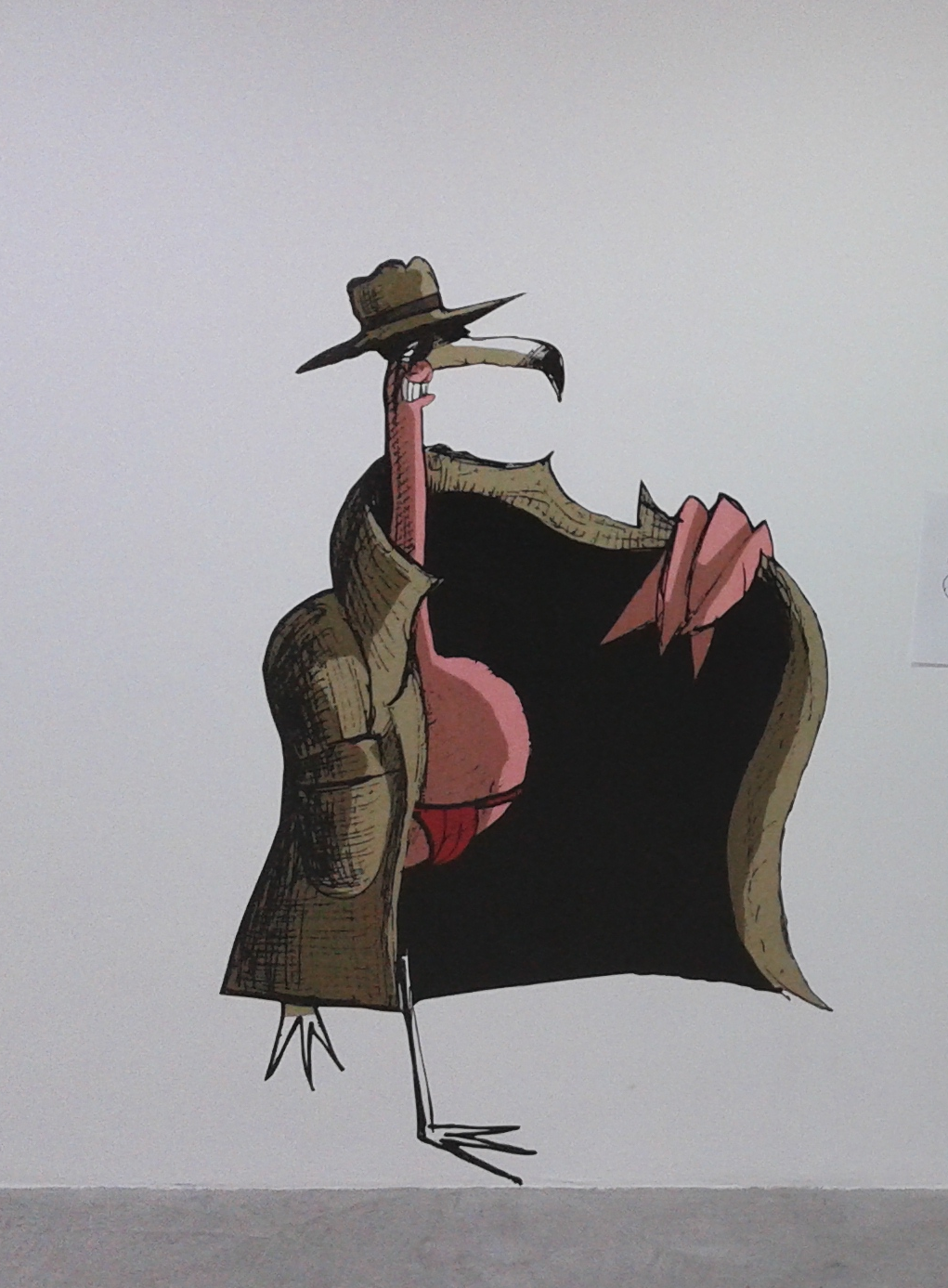
- Représentation de Z
- Born: 1979 (age 46–47)
- Known for: Political cartoonist

_Z_, also known as simply Z, is the nom de plume of an anonymous Tunisian political cartoonist and online activist whose humorous cartoons and writings have appeared on his online blog DébaTunisie, which he launched in 2007, and have targeted the government of Zine El Abidine Ben Ali and the administrations that followed the Tunisian Revolution of 2011.

== History ==
_Z_, an architect, launched his blog on August 28, 2007. He first began criticizing government development projects in the Tunisian capital, Tunis, and the fact that residents had no say on the matter. _Z_ believed that the government's plans threatened the natural habitat of the city's local flamingo population. A signature pink flamingo later became his blog's mascot, and appeared in many of his future drawings. In 2008, he started posting cartoons on DébaTunisie. Among his first drawings was one of a small demonstration by a group of pink flamingos protesting the government's projects. His first cartoon featuring the country's president, Zine El Abidine Ben Ali, was posted in March 2009, ahead of the upcoming presidential election that same year, which depicts men in a mosque bowing in the direction of a mural portrait of Ben Ali instead of Mecca.

The government took notice of his online activism in October 2009 after he drew a cartoon titled "La Comédie électorale", two days following Ben Ali's re-election. A month later, authorities arrested and later released an online blogger and university professor named Fatma Riahi, wrongly assuming her to be _Z_, whose blog they had already tried to shut down.

=== Post-revolution ===
In the days and months following the stepping down of Ben Ali on January 14, 2011, _Z_ posted a series of cartoons about his optimistic vision for a Tunisia in which the country's social and political constituents, particularly secularists and Islamists, would coexist peacefully. He chose, however, to remain anonymous, believing that "nothing really changed" in regards to Tunisia's censorship issue.

Following Tunisia's first free election since Ben Ali's overthrow, which saw the Islamist Ennahda Movement win the majority of seats, _Z_ attracted criticism from Islamists and online followers due to some cartoons that were perceived as insulting to Islam. On August 7, 2012, he wrote on his blog: "It is evident that I will soon be regarded as an outlaw the moment the Constituency validates the anti-blasphemy law."

== Style ==
Among the noticeable themes in _Z_'s writings and cartoons are the "mauves", (Note: Representing the color of Ben Ali's ruling party, the Democratic Constitutional Rally (RCD).) supporters of the government of Ben Ali, whom he calls "Zaba" (acronym of his full name). He also refers to Islamists as the "bleus", who are under the leadership of "Zaballah", a play on words merging Zaba (the initials of Zine el Abidine Ben Ali) with "Allah". Another recurrent feature in his cartoons is the "Ben Simpsons" family, representing the typical secular Tunisian bourgeoisie that is alarmed by the country's political developments.

== See also ==
- Political cartoons in the Middle East
