= Law of Jordan =

The Law of Jordan is influenced by Ottoman law and European laws. The Great Arab Revolt 1916 threw out Ottoman rule. In 1920, the San Remo Conference gave mandate powers to the British. When the mandate ended in 1946 shortly after WWII, Amir Abdullah was crowned king of the now independent state of Jordan. A parliamentary system headed by the King was established. The Constitution of Jordan of 1952 affirmed Islam as the state religion, but it did not state that Islam is the source of legislation. Arabic was established as the official language. However, it also recognized religious and ethnic pluralism by banning discrimination based on race, language, or religion. Personal freedoms pertaining to expression, worship, press, opinion, scientific research and literary, and assembly are protected, but subject to possible limitation by law. Jordan is under the penal code that was established in 1960, and heavily influenced by the French Penal Code of 1810 as well as the Lebanese Criminal Law of 1943.

== Historical background ==
Jordanian law is influenced by Ottoman law. Until 1918, the Kingdom of Jordan was part of the Ottoman Empire and its legal system consisted of Shari'a courts whose decisions were based on the four schools of Islamic law (called madhhab). These four madhabib are: Hanafi, Maliki, Shafi'i, and Hanbali. While secular courts have been established under the Jordanian government in modern times, areas of personal status still fall within the jurisdiction of religious shari'a courts.

Tribes were very important in Jordan and the tribes had varied legal traditions. During the Tanzimat reforms of the Ottoman legal system, the Ottoman Mecelle was introduced to Jordan.

The 1917 Ottoman Family Code forms the basis of modern Jordanian personal status laws.

== Modern era ==
The first Constitution of Jordan was adopted in 1948. This started the process of creating a national legal system in the Post-Ottoman period. Both the 1948 and 1952 constitutions of Jordan affirm that Islam is the state religion. The first Jordanian Law of Family Rights was enacted in 1947; it was replaced by the Law of Family Rights 1951. In 1952 the Jordanian Law of Personal Status was enacted. The first modern Shari'a courts were established in Jordan in 1951. These courts are based on the Hanafi school, but Jordanian laws about women draw on Maliki law.

Under the 1952 Constitution shari'a courts have exclusive jurisdiction over matters regarding the "personal status" of Muslims, including marriage, divorce, guardianship and inheritance. Shari'a courts also exercise jurisdiction over Muslim religious endowments (waqfs), "purely religious affairs" and the reconciliation of blood feuds through blood money (called diyah). In cases concerning blood feuds the shari'a courts have exclusive jurisdiction if both parties involved are Muslim. In cases where one party is Muslim and the other non-Muslim, the shari'a courts will have jurisdiction only if the non-Muslim party agrees to trial before a shari'a court.

== Major areas of law ==
=== Criminal law ===
Jordanian criminal law is based on the Ottoman Law of 1858, which in turn is based upon the French Penal Code of 1810. In 1960 Jordan issued Criminal Law no. 16. This law was strongly influenced by the Lebanese Criminal Law of 1943, which borrowed provisions from the French Penal Code regarding penalties for crimes committed against women (art 562).

Jordanian law classifies crimes and their respective punishments by severity. Most severe are felonies which are punishable by death, life imprisonment, or long-term imprisonment. Misdemeanors are less severe and sentenced up to 3 years in prison or a fine. Notable crimes in this category include sex outside of marriage, adultery, and blasphemy which prohibits anyone from demeaning religions and their followers and insulting prophets. The least severe offense are infractions, which are very minor and usually have a small fine attached.

"Honor crimes" are special type of crime as well. It is stated in Article 340 of the Penal Code and allows for the killings of girls or women accused of sexual transgressions, in order to cleanse family honor. Perpetrators receive more leniency with their punishments under this condition. For example, a man may kill his sister for "family honor" purposes and receive a lesser sentence. However, due to public pressure and international influence, this is slowly changing. Men were able to invoke Article 98 which stated allowed for reduced penalties for crimes committed in a "fit of fury." However, in 2017, this was amended to disallow such mitigation for crimes against women, aiming to address the injustice of these honor crimes However, a loophole still exists in article 340 that allows lenient sentences for the murder of a spouse found red-handedly committing adultery.

=== Personal status law ===
The Personal Status law is the family law applies to all disputes involving Muslims and the children of Muslim fathers. Many Jordanian Christians voluntarily accept the jurisdiction of the Personal Status law in matters regarding inheritances.

==== Marriage ====
The legal age of marriage has been increased to 18, but at the chief justice's discretion this may be lowered to 15. All Jordanian Muslims are required to be married under Islamic law. Article 19 of the Personal Status law allows women to place conditions on their marriage contracts, within certain limitations. As most women are not aware of this right, it is rarely used in practice. Women's rights advocates suggest that a list of possible conditions attached to the contract would to inform women of their rights under Jordanian law. The Jordanian government has elected to adhere to the Maliki school in some matters, which has restricted women's marriage rights. Muslim men can marry non-Muslim women, but Muslim women are not allowed to marry non-Muslim men. Hanafi law, which is the dominant influence in Jordan, does not require the consent of a male guardian for a woman to marry. However, under the law applied in Jordan a woman can not marry without the permission of either a Shari'a judge or a male guardian.

===== Divorce =====
Filing for divorce in Jordan does require legal proceedings through the Shari'a courts. Either husband or wife can initiate the divorce process. For Muslim men, they can unilaterally divorce their wife by pronouncing "talaq" (repudiation) without without any reason and without the need for court permission. As for Muslim women, there are two ways to go about initiating divorce:

1. Khul' (Mutual Consent Divorce): This requires the wife to initiate divorce by returning her dowry (mahr) and renouncing financial rights, requiring the husband's consent and potentially court intervention if an agreement isn't reached.
2. Judicial Divorce: If the husband does not consent to a divorce, the wife can petition the Shari'a courts. The wife must provide a valid reason for seeking divorce. These grounds include: harm or physical abuse, a husband's prolonged absence or imprisonment, failure to provide maintenance or shelter, non-payment of the dower, or a husband's severe medical condition (must be verified by a medical certification). The wife must provide sufficient evidence for each of her complaints, and usually these hearings take years to resolve.

Women are allowed to remarry, but they must follow the Islamic law's "iddah" period (a waiting period after divorce or death of a husband) before remarrying. Despite these options, many socio-economic and legal reasons stand in a woman's way of getting divorce. One of the biggest reasons that these divorce cases rarely deliver justice is cultural stigma that exists around divorces. The culture is set up to blame a woman for her failed marriage.

==== Custody ====
The Personal Status law does not allow women to have guardianship over children, though this would be allowed under Islamic legal principles. In Jordan, fathers are granted wilaya, which refers to legal authority over the child, while mothers are given hadhana, which refers to physical care of the child. However, hadhana can be taken from a mother if she is found to be ‘unfit’ or remarries. Mothers are granted custody of their children, until the age of 15, but fathers possess the right to determine their children's education, country of residence, medical treatment, and religious upbringing.

Women must have the approval of their male guardians until the age of 30. Normally this is their father, brother or uncle. Once she is married, the husband becomes the primary guardian. Their approval is required for marriage, traveling abroad with children, and work outside the home. Failure to adhere to the male guardian's wishes is punishable by jail.

=== Commercial law ===
Jordan's commercial law is designed to attract foreign investment and regulate trade, business, and investment activities. Much of this was established during the Ottoman Empire with European influence to open up markets. Since then, it has undergone several amendments to addressing emerging market challenges that protect both domestic and international interest. Jordan's commercial legal framework is primarily governed by the Companies Law No. 22 of 1997, which outlines the formation, regulation, and dissolution of various company types, including General Partnerships, Limited Partnerships, Limited Liability Companies (LLCs), Private Shareholding Companies, and Public Shareholding Companies.

Commercial law falls under the private law category. It is mainly concerned with the protection of business and consumers and the regulation of business activities. The Jordanian Civil Code contains the Law of Obligations and Contracts which are vital in Jordan for the functioning and operation of business domestically and abroad. Treaties are ratified by the legislation before they become effective. Both public and private sectors are governed by a single set of laws and regulations. To enforce these, the Jordanian Temporary Laws and Regulations Act 2015, No. 30 has aimed to improve the transparency and accessibility of temporary laws by requiring that they be published in the official newspaper and on the internet. They are treated as permanent unless another act is passed to annul them. Other government agencies such as the Ministry of Industry and Trade keep businesses accounted for are also present.

The main idea of Jordanian commercial law is to transmit the system from a centrally directed economy to a market-oriented to enable economic growth. Jordan believes it is compulsory to create an environment for healthy competition and enterprise. Compared to more common law practices, Jordan emphasizes mandatory registration and protective agency rights. Especially as it pertains foreign investment, Jordan is more restricted and bureaucratic in its practices. Especially as it pertains to media sources such as newspapers, radio broadcasts, and news outlets are substantially regulated in order to "maintain [Jordanian] cultural relevance". There are also caps foreign ownership caps in Jordan. For instance, in the financial services sector, including banking and insurance, foreign ownership is typically capped at 50%. Incentives for foreign investments exist to partner with local companies to protect both national interest and foreign investment.

=== Refugee law ===
Jordan hosts one of the highest refugee numbers relative to population size. In 1951, the UN's Refugee Convention was held and established a framework for refugee protection, defined what a refugee is, and outlined rights and security obligations for states hosting them. Jordan refused to sign the convention or its 1967 Protocol, which distinguishes it from many other refugee-hosting countries. Its Constitution does state "political refugees shall not be extradited on account of their political beliefs or for their defense of liberty". However, there is a limited national framework of addressing refugee status and initiating dedicated legislation to this issue. They are treated under general immigration laws, such as the Law of Residence and Foreigners' Affairs No. 24 of 1973. This law refers to all foreigners who do not have Jordanian nationality. While Jordan is quite welcoming to refugee populations, they do not have the adequate resources to address their needs. Oftentimes, refugees in Jordan are considered "guests" and lack a formal status. This restricts access to employment, healthcare, and other rights. Nationality serves as a primary source from which civil rights and entitlement are derived.

Some refugee camps, most notable Palestinian and Syrian, have become permanent settlements. The Jordanian government recognizes their existence and works with the United Nations to facilitate and provide aid services to the camps. These resources are generally limited and refugees live in poor conditions with limited food. Jordan has also been criticized for its hierarchical and selective approach to asylum recognition. Syrians are granted special rights and work permits in comparison to Yemenis. New regulations in 2020 significantly restricted Yemeni refugees labor market access, often leading to deportation if they worked while holding asylum seeker documentation. Reports indicate that 61% of working non-Syrians lack work permits. Additionally, Syrian refugees benefit from social services such as education and healthcare, whereas additional costs are required from Yemenis, Sudanese, Somalian, and Iraqi refugee families.

==== Memorandum of Understanding ====
The Memorandum of Understanding between United Nations High Commissioner for Refugees (UNHCR) and the Jordanian government was signed in 1998 and partially amended in 2014. It formed the basis for UNHCR's activities in Jordan, Ultimately, it granted UNHCR full responsibility for determining refugee status and obligates Jordan to respect the principle of non-refoulement. Additionally, this document was revised following Syria's Civil war in 2011. It allowed Syrians to receive an Asylum Seeker Certificate (ASC). Since 2014, the Jordanian Ministry of Interior has also issued Syrian refugees registered with UNHCR a service card which grants access to public services such as free education and subsidized healthcare. This protection was both temporary and limited, as they were only valid for one year and granted limited legal rights.

Jordan's refugee laws are severely underdeveloped, relying heavily on the support of international organizations to facilitate status and humanitarian assistance.

== Human rights ==
=== Women's rights ===
There have been significant advancements to women's rights in Jordan. Article 308 of the Penal Code, which had exonerated rapists if they married their victims, was reformed in 2017. Now, the perpetrator is held accountable and undergoes a proper legal proceeding.

The Jordanian Constitution also guarantees women the right to work in Jordan, in both public and private sectors. Jordan removed restrictions on a woman's employment in industrial jobs and has prohibited gender-based discrimination in employment and enacted legislation protecting a woman from sexual harassment in employment, including criminal penalties. Despite this, women's participation in the work force remains relatively low. This is due to a variety of cultural, religious, and social traditions that keep them confined to the home.

In government, the Electoral Law increased the number of quota seats for women from 15 to 18. This is out of the 138 seats in the House of Representatives. Female senators have also been appointed by the king. In the September 2024 parliamentary elections, women secured 27 out of 138 seats in the House of Representatives, accounting for approximately 19.6% of the total.

In 2019, women were allowed to serve as fighter pilots in the Jordanian military, a field traditionally marked as a domain for men.

=== Homosexuality ===
Although same-sex relations in Jordan have technically been legal since 1951, there have been ongoing efforts to minimize LGBT visibility and increase discrimination. In December 2021, the General Iftaa Department issued a religious ruling (Fatwa) declaring that “homosexuality is illegal under Islamic law". While this is not legally binding, the General Iftaa Department acts in an advisory capacity to government branches and courts. There have been additional measures put in place to target LGBT individuals. Online magazines and websites have been blocked by authorities, Grindr (the world's largest social networking app for gay, bi, trans, and queer people) was banned, and communities have been attacked, outed, harassed, and arrested by Jordanian secret police.

== The courts and the judiciary ==
Jordan's branches of government include executive, legislative, and judicial. The executive branch is led by a heredity monarch, or the king. The monarch approves and dismisses judges, signs or vetos all laws, and can suspend or dissolve parliament. There is also a prime minister within the executive branch, who is appointed by the king, and responsible for advising him. There are no elections for the king or prime minister.

The legislative branch is bicameral. The Lower House (138 members) is elected by the people of Jordan, and the Upper House (65 members) is appointed by the king. Both houses are responsible for drafting, approving, and amending legislature. They can override the king's veto vote by two-thirds. Each member serves for a total of 4 years.

As for the judicial branch, its role is to enforce proper interpretation of the Constitution. Its constitution guarantees "Judges are independent, and they are not subject to any authority, in their jurisdiction, other than that of the law." The highest courts include the Court of Cassation or Supreme Court (consists of 15 members, including the chief justice); Constitutional Court (consists of nine members). The chief justice is appointed by the king, while the others are nominated by the higher judicial council and approved by the king. They serve for six years.

Other subordinate courts include the Courts of Appeal, Great Felonies Court, religious courts, military courts, juvenile courts, Land Settlement Courts, Income Tax Court, Higher Administrative Court, Customs Court, and special courts including the State Security Court.

=== Religious courts ===
Shari'a courts only have jurisdiction over personal matters, including areas of family law like marriage or divorce, child custody, adoption, and inheritance matters. Islamic religious courts only have jurisdiction over Muslims. Christians have separate religious councils for most matters. Inheritance laws are a special case which are administered through the religious courts of the family's religion, but governed by Shari'a principles in all cases.

The shari'a court system has both courts of first instance and courts of appeal. The High Court of Justice has appellate jurisdiction over the lower appeal courts. Shari'a court judges are selected from among the ulama.

=== Civil courts ===
Civil courts are reserved matters in Jordan dealing with a wide range of matters including disputes, criminal offenses, and cases against the government. Civil jurisdiction is exercised at four levels. In ascending order, this includes the magistrate courts, the courts of first instance, the courts of appeal, and the court of cassation or the supreme court. Lower courts handle small-level crimes with sentences up to two years, and amounts of money not exceeding 750 Jordanian Dinars (approximately $1,000 US Dollars).

=== Special courts ===
Jordanian Special Courts handle specific cases dealing with national security (smuggling, bribery of public officials, etc.), military personnel, and administrative matters, land settlements, income tax, and customs. The State Security court handles matters such as terrorism and drug trafficking. It has been criticized for a lack of transparency and corruption. Executive interference by the king has been observed to interfere with judicial decisions. In 2014, Jordan began efforts to incorporate anti-corrupt laws to comply with international standards. It instituted protections for whistleblowers, witnesses, informants, corruption case experts, and their relatives. A unit was established to ensure the requests of these whistleblowers were being met.

== Influence in the Occupied Palestinian territories ==
In 1916, the League of Nations established the Sykes-Picot agreement, which was a secret agreement that carved out previous Ottoman territories for British and French mandate. As the British occupation of Palestine and Trans-Jordan from 1917 to 1948, Jordan's geographic proximity adopted much of English common law. In 1921, the British established the Emirate of Transjordan under the Hashemite ruler Abdullah I. With this, the British recognized an “independent Government” (not however an independent state) in Trans-Jordan. This came as a result of a few key factors. The first that during WWI, the British made a promise to Arab leaders that they would support Arab independence in exchange for revolting against the Ottoman Empire. Additionally, following the collapse of the Arab Syrian Kingdom, Transjordan became a politically unstable area. The British aimed to stabilize the area without direct colonial control; they only governed major decisions about foreign affairs, military, and budget. Abdullah made decisions about domestic issues. This laid the framework for the creation of modern-day Jordan. From 1921 to 1946, this hybrid system between Abdullah and the British was employed.

In 1946, the British formally recognized Jordan as a fully sovereign state in a treaty of alliance entered into at London with Amir Abdullah. Despite this, British troops remained in the country until 1957, primarily to support the Hashemite monarchy and maintain regional stability. This continued presence was part of the broader Anglo-Jordanian relationship established during the mandate period.

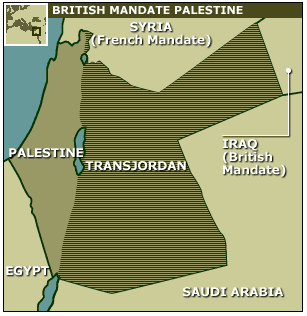
Map of the British Mandate of Transjordan and Palestine

The Israel Defense Forces accepted that the West Bank would be governed under the law that was in effect before 5 June 1967 with the condition that "security enactments take precedence over all law, even if they do not explicitly repeal it." Although passed after 1967, the Jordanian Law of Personal Status (JLPS) of 1976 is applied by West Bank courts.

The Shari'a courts of the West Bank and the Jordanian-administered Shari'a court in East Jerusalem are governed under Jordanian law, especially the Law of Shar'i Procedure of 1959. Included within the Shari'a courts jurisdiction are waqf (religious endowments), family law, personal status issues, and petitions for diya (monetary damages for murder or physical injuries). The Shar'a courts have jurisdiction over these matters where the parties are Muslim, or in cases where a non-Muslim party agrees to their jurisdiction.

== See also ==
- Jerusalem Islamic Waqf
- 2023 cybercrime law in Jordan
- Law enforcement in Jordan
- Parliament of Jordan
- Constitution of Jordan

== Bibliography ==
- Albalawee, N., Al-Raggad, M., & Hammouri, J. (2024). The Regulating Legal Provisions of the Removal of Commons by Disposal: The Real Estate Ownership Law of 2019. Pakistan Journal of Criminology, 16(2)
- Al-Hawari, S. Z. M. (2022). The Historical Development of Criminal Legislation in Jordan. Journal of Positive School Psychology, 9969–9977.
- Alqudah, F. (2008). The Legal Protection of Databases: a Study of Jordanian Law. Arab Law Quarterly, 22(4), 359–386.
- Al-Zawahreh, M. M. (2023). Foreign Workers in the Jordanian Labor Law.
- Cherland, K. (2014). The Development Of Personal Status Law In Jordan & Iraq.
- El Muhtaseb, L., Brown, N. J., & Kayyali, A. W. (2016). Arguing about Family Law in Jordan: Disconnected Spheres?. International Journal of Middle East Studies, 48(4), 721–741.
- Engelcke, D. (2018). Law-making in Jordan: Family law reform and the Supreme Justice Department. Islamic Law and Society, 25(3), 274–309.
- Nawafleh, A. (2010). Development of intellectual property laws and foreign direct investment in Jordan. J. Int'l Com. L. & Tech., 5, 142.
- Nesheiwat, F. K. (2004). Honor crimes in Jordan: Their treatment under Islamic and Jordanian criminal laws. Penn St. Int'l L. Rev., 23, 251.
- Prettitore, P. S. (2015). Family law reform, gender equality, and underage marriage: A view from Morocco and Jordan. The Review of Faith & International Affairs, 13(3), 32–40.
- Shwarah, J. (2023). Procedures for Requesting Permission to Own Property for Non-Jordanian Foreigners. Global Journal of Politics and Law Research, 11(1), 1-29.
- Sonbol, A. E. A. (2003). Women of Jordan: Islam, labor, and the law. Syracuse University Press.
- Warrick, C. (2005). The vanishing victim: Criminal law and gender in Jordan. Law & Society Review, 39(2), 315–348.
- Welchman, L. (1988). The development of Islamic family law in the legal system of Jordan. International & Comparative Law Quarterly, 37(4), 868–886.
