= The Star (Jordan) =

English-language weekly newspaper in Jordan

- Type: Weekly newspaper
- Format: broadsheet
- Owner(s): Jordan Press and Publishing Company
- Founded: 1993
- Ceased publication: August 2011
- Headquarters: Amman, Jordan
- Price: JOD0.35
- Website: www.star.com.jo

The Star was an English-language newspaper published in Amman, Jordan, every Thursday. It was one of the English-language weeklies in the country.

== History and profile ==
The Star was an independent political, economic and cultural weekly. Its name was changed in 1993 when it became a broadsheet, and before that it was known as the Jerusalem Star, which made its début in 1966 in Jerusalem, where it was published for six months in broadsheet format and tackled political, economic, social and cultural issues. Its publisher was Jordan Press and Publishing Company.

Its first editor-in-chief in Jerusalem was the late Mahmood Al Sherif, then also publisher of the Arabic-language Ad-Dustour that started publication in Amman in 1967. However, the Jerusalem Star was to wait, it resumed weekly publication in 1982 as in tabloid format, and continued for most of the 1980s. However, in 1993 it returned to the broadsheet format until August 2008 when a decision was made to turn it into a tabloid with a glossy cover and in full color; day of publication was moved from Thursday to Monday for marketing reasons.

It was closed down in 1988 after a government clampdown on the press, but resumed publication in 1990 under Osama El Sherif, the younger son of Mahmood. After 1993, The Star was thought to have resumed a more serious outlook, tackling issues for local intellectuals, businessmen and politicians. Sixty percent of its readers were said to be Jordanians, including public officials and civil servants, those who want to read a newspaper in English.

The foreign community in Jordan, especially the diplomatic corps also read the newspaper, and look for local news through its columns. They were particularly interested in local art reviews of on-going exhibit which it carried out every week for a long times. It does so presently but only haphazardly.

The Star published its last edition towards the end of August 2011.

== Editorial changes ==
After 1993 there was a revamping of the newspaper in line with its news broadsheet image. While the sections continued as they are, Q/A interviews with leading politicians and activists become regular, and new columns were introduced such as "People and Politics", "Middle East Beat", "Scrapbook" and later "From Our Neck of the Woods" (written for about one year). Two new columns "Jordan Diary" and "Reflections" were also started early 2003, written by the newly appointed assistant managing editor, Walid Kalaji Existing columns like "Jordan Week" and "Business Chronicle" were revamped. New features become regular, and there was more variety, tackling issues that are not usually found in mainstream newspapers. "Press Cocktail" was another column that began in 1994, dealing with issues from the Arabic weekly press. Like all columns in The Star it had a satirical feel that increased popularity.

Some of the features centered on street children, violence against women, a day in the life of politicians. There were regular economic features on the stock exchange, insurance and banking. There was more reviews of local art exhibitions which were very popular with the foreign community. Many of the columns continue to exist except for "People Politics", being phased out after The Star rejoined Ad Dustour. Comments received at the newspaper always pointed to the need to concentrate on the commentary, analytical side of news, rather than the reporting of it. It being an English-language newspaper the editorial team had always felt they had higher ceiling than the Arabic dailies, which it utilised to its own advantage while taking care not to overstep the unspoken red lines.

All these changes were made under the direction of Osama El Sherif, a United States-educated journalist who believed in the power of the press as an agent for change. He wanted to transfer his professionalism to the staff running the newspaper. He was a committed journalist believing that everyone was entitled to know the truth regardless. And he sought to convey this in his writings, in the features he told his reporters to write, in his analysis and editorials he wrote on the peace process, on Palestinian politics, Jordan or on Israeli and American double-dealing.

Needless to say, The Star operated on a skeleton staff, the forgotten soldiers who would produce edition after edition, week in, week out. It was almost living in the trenches; all the staff would work from the few journalists to the editors, and Osama El Sherif was at it tackling anything and everything that was humanly interesting.

== Website ==
The Star was thought to be the first English newspaper in Jordan to go into cyberspace and have an internet website with the first posts of its articles towards the end of 1994. During its hay days in the 1990s we were told up to 100,000 visited the website every month. The website become a source of information especially for Arab expatriates living mainly in the United States and Europe, and through the website The Star was being quoted regularly by such newspapers as The Guardian, The New York Times and the Jerusalem Post. Very occasionally The Star would have news that would be picked up by international wire agencies like Reuters and the Associated Press and distributed locally through such papers as the Jordan Times.

== Pagination ==
The Star followed the American style of spelling and had distinct pagination. The first two words of the start of the article would always be capitalized. It always was indented as well. Similarly the interviews would start with an editor's note followed by a colon and end with "Excerpts follow". There would be bullet points at the end of each article. A newspaper stylebook was compiled in 1998 by Dr Marwan Asmar, its managing editor from 1993 till 2003. He was soon succeeded by Walid Kalaji as Managing Editor in 2004 until the newspaper was suspended and closed down after August 2011. The decision to suspend The Star was taken by the government-appointed temporary committee following the resignation of the mother company's board of directors in July 2011; the reason for suspension was given as "cutting down on expenditure".

=== Back to Ad Dustour ===
The Star continued independently until 1998, when it came under the flagship of Ad Dustour because of a series of economic difficulties. It was thought a new injection would turn the newspaper around. The pages slowly increased from 12 to 16 and today it is open to 20. More features pages were introduced, for example dealing with health and books. It had always had two French pages, and even added however a Russian-language page because of the increasing Russian community in Jordan.

Maha Al-Sharif took over as responsible editor-in-chief in September 2003 with a new editorial team, including managing editor Walid Kalaji who started to write the weekly editorial column until the last days of The Star. A number of famous people who worked for The Star had already moved on to greater things, including Jordanian academic and novelist Fadia Faqir, who lives in the UK, as well as CNN Cairo correspondent Ben Wedeman. They occasionally remember The Star in their conversations and hark back on the days when they were there.

== Crossing the red lines ==
On many points The Star crossed the red lines. For The Star Ben Wedeman was the first to interview Israeli politicians after 1993 and 1994 when the Palestinians and Jordanians signed peace treaties with Israel. The Star was the first to go to the Israeli Knesset and interview Shimon Peres, the Labor Party Leader, and Benjamin Netanyahu, the leader of the Likud.

These were very daring moving, and some of the interviews were picked by agencies such as the Associated Press, but the English weekly was criticized by Jordanian and Palestinian nationalists who were against the peace process, calling the paper as "normalizers", and "talking with the enemy".

But The Star always tried for a balanced approach not only to the peace process but to politics and political development and would strive to carry the views of both sides of the argument.

== A cultural history ==
In a very definitive way The Star presented the pulse of Jordan at a particular moment in the 1990s and after the year 2000. One felt it through the issues it raised and the analysis it put forward. It was an independent newspaper, and had a strong political message that was nationalistic but this was based on rational arguments and thinking. It did not believe in chauvinism or bigotry, seeing humans as one but argued for justice. It never believed in parochialism and racist thinking. There was a cultural message and a cultural euphoria in its different pages and columns. After 1994 for instance, there was a strong anti-normalization movement and many in Jordan did not want to establish relations with Israel. For its part The Star carried stories on the anti-normalization movement, talking to people with different trends and perspectives, and point of views.
