= List of newspapers in Jordan =

This is a list of newspapers in Jordan.

Name	Established	Language	Editor	Period	Political view	Website
Ad-Dustour	1967	Arabic	Saif Alsharif	Daily	Pro government / semi-independent	www.addustour.com
Al-Arab Al-Yawm	1997	Arabic	Tahir Al Udwan	Daily	Pan Arab	www.alarabalyawm.net
Al Ghad	2004	Arabic	Muhammad Alayyan	Daily	Liberal	www.alghad.com
Al Ra'i	1971	Arabic	Abdul-Wahhab Zughailat	Daily	Pro government	www.alrai.com
Assabeel	1993	Arabic	Editor	Daily	Islamic conservative	www.assabeel.net
Al Anbat	2005	Arabic	Riyadh Horoob	Daily	Nationalist	www.alanbat.net
The Jordan Times	1975	English	Raed Omari	Daily	Independent	www.jordantimes.com
Jordan News	2021	English	Mahmoud Al Abed	Daily	Independent	www.jordannews.jo
Al Liwaa	1972	Arabic	Bilal Hasan Al Tel	Weekly	Liberal	www.aliwaa.com
Shihan	1991	Arabic	Jihad Momani	Weekly	Liberal	www.shihan-news.com
Al Ahali	2006	Arabic	Adnan Khalifa	Weekly	Nationalist	www.hashd-ahali.org.jo
The Star	1993	English	Editor	Weekly	Pro government / semi-independent	www.star.com.jo

== Daily newspapers ==
- Al Ra'ai, national
- Ad-Dustour, national
- Al Ghad, national
- Ammon News, online newspaper
- Jordan Times, English; national
- Jordan News, English; national
- Saraya, online newspaper

== Suspended dailies ==
- Al Arab Al Yawm

== Weekly newspapers ==
- Al Ahali, leftist voice of the Jordanian Democratic People's Party (Hashd), not strictly party political but run on newspaper lines
- Al Kalimah
- Al Liwaa
- Al Majd, pan-Arab nationalist
- Al Watan, nationalistic slant
- Asrar Newspaper
- Assabeel, Islamic
- Fact International, English and Arabic published every Wednesday
- Hawadeth Al Saaeh
- Shihan
- The Star, English weekly, independent, political, economic, social, published every Thursday

== See also ==
- List of newspapers
