= Assabeel =

- Type: Weekly newspaper
- Format: Print, online
- Owner(s): Jordan Press Foundation
- Editor: Atef Al Jolani
- Founded: 1993; 32 years ago
- Language: Arabic
- Headquarters: Amman, Jordan
- Circulation: 17,000 (2002)
- Website: Official website

Assabeel (Arabic: السبيل; lit. 'The Path') is an Arabic weekly newspaper in Amman, Jordan. The paper was described by a leaked US cable as an Islamist publication.

== History ==
Assabeel was launched by the Muslim Brotherhood members in Jordan in 1993. Editor-in-chief of the paper is Atef Al Joulani. The paper was the continuation of the Brotherhood's official publication Al Ribat. The 2002 circulation of the paper was reported by Saud Abu Mahfuz, general manager of the weekly, to be 17,000. The paper became daily in 2009.

== See also ==
- List of newspapers in Jordan
