= Mohammad Tomaliah =

Mohammad Tomaliah (1957–2008; Arabic: محمد طملية), a Jordanian writer and journalist, was born in Karak, south of Jordan in 1957. He is considered one of Jordan’s leading satirical writers, who achieved a local and Arab fame. He started his career at Ad-Dustor daily in 1983. He also wrote for other dailies and was a member of the Jordanian Writers Association and of the Arab Writers Association.

Tomaliah is the first Jordanian writer to write satirical articles and stories. He created a unique literary genre where he combined literary and journalistic style in writing that is free of flowery language and cliches.

== Early life ==
Mohammad Abdullah Mustafa Tomaliah was born in Abu Tarraba village in the governorate of Karak, south of Jordan. He was born to a family who was originally from Innaba village in the Palestinian city of Al-Ramla. Since his childhood, Tomalaih was captivated by world literature, including the Russian. Tomalaih would memorize multiple excerpts from Russian novels and imitated the characters in these novels.

== Education ==
He earned a BA in Arabic literature from the University of Jordan in 1985.

== Works ==
1. Round of Arak "Jawlat Arak"( short stories), 1980
2. The disappointment, "Al Khaibah", 1981
3. Remarks on a basic issue, "Mulahazat ala Qadiah Asassiah" 1981
4. The scoundrel enthusiasts,"Al Moutahmisoun Al Awaghad", 1986
5. Happens to me among all people,"Yahduth Le doun Sa'r Al Nas" articles accompanied with selected cartoons drawn by Emad Hajjaj cartoons, 2004
6. To her as a matter of course, "Ilayhā bi-ṭabī’at al-ḥāl- nuṣūṣ khādishah lil-ḥiyād al-‘āmm", 2007

== Death ==
Tomaliah died in 2008 after suffering for four years from cancer. He is celebrated by Mohammad Tomaliah Award for Short Stories.
