= Abu Zant =

Jordanian politician (1937–2015)

Sheikh Abdul Munem Abu Zant (Arabic: عبد المنعم أبو زنط, 28 September 1937 – 26 July 2015) was a Jordanian Muslim scholar and politician. He was member of the House of Representatives between 1989 and 1997 for the Islamic Action Front. He was an opponent of the Israel–Jordan peace treaty and a supporter of Hamas. Abu Zant frequently criticized the Western world and especially the United States and Israel. He was also critical of moderate Islamic regimes in the Middle East.

Abu Zant had confrontations with the Jordanian government several times. He was banned from delivering sermons in 1994 and was arrested several times for breaching that prohibition the same year. Critique of government actions against Hamas had him arrested in 1999 and 2001.

== Career ==
Abu Zant was born in Nablus on 28 September 1937. At one point he became member of the Muslim Brotherhood. He was elected to the House of Representatives during the 1989 Jordanian general elections. Abu Zant was a member of the House between 1989 and 1997 (or 1990 and 1998) for the Islamic Action Front (IAF), serving during three parliaments. Abu Zant called himself the leader of the most radical section of the party. Within the IAF Abu Zant had a sizeable group of followers. During his time in parliament Abu Zant supported introducing prohibition as well as a mandatory headscarf for Muslim women. When female Representative Faisal kept her own style of dress in parliament Abu Zant offered her an Islamic garb and sweets to stop wearing her own clothes and make-up.

Abu Zant was an opponent of the Coalition forces during the Gulf War. He called the Gulf War: "not a war between Iraq and the U.S., but rather one between Islam and the infidels". He subsequently called for a jihad against Western forces involved in the Gulf War. Abu Zant called the Arab regimes that took part in the Gulf War against Iraq apostates. During and after the Gulf War Abu Zant was a frequent speaker at Friday preaching ceremonies at mosques.

In 1994 Abu Zant was prohibited from delivering sermons by the Ministry of Awqaf Islamic Affairs and Holy Places, after he criticized the Israel–Jordan peace treaty, which had been signed that year. The same year he violated his prohibition when he spoke in a mosque criticizing the peace treacy. A scuffle occurred in which Abu Zant was injured, with Abu Zant and his followers and other preachers claiming the police acted violently, while the police blamed the followers of the official imam of the mosque, Sami al-Najjar, who had been prevented from delivering his own speech by Abu Zant. He later criticized official clerics in parliament, claiming that they were asking God to be merciful on Israelis, with Abu Zant referring to the Israelis as "the killers of all God's emissaries and prophets". Shortly afterwards Abu Zant was arrested for criticizing an Amman court which was holding trials against people claimed of disturbing the peace during anti-peace treaty demonstrations. In 1994 Abu Zant wrote several articles in the newspaper Al Arab Al Yawm, which led to chief editor's arrest, as well as his own. In late November the two men were brought before a court on charges of slandering Prime Minister Abdelsalam al-Majali.

In September 1999 the governor of Amman, Qaftan Majali, asked Abu Zant to sign a pledge withholding him from keeping pro-Hamas speeches. Abu Zant refused and was placed under administrative arrest. In total he was arrested three times during the month for violating the Sermons Law of Jordan. Shortly before his arrest he had criticized a government crackdown on Hamas supporters, which happened in August. The Muslim Brotherhood subsequently demanded his release. During his life Abu Zant had been expelled from Egypt, Kuwait and Saudi Arabia as his voiced opinions were deemed to radical.

In 2001, with tensions relaxing between Israelis and Palestinians and a possible peace deal ahead, Jordan launched actions against Hamas. Both the Muslim Brotherhood and the Islamic Action Front protested against these, although the protests were not large. Abu Zant however did protest fiercely, accusing the Jordanian government of collaborating with the United States and the Israeli intelligence agency Mossad, which led to him being arrested.

In 2014 during an interview on Al-Aqsa TV Abu Zant accused Jews of blood libel and cannibalism.

Abu Zant died on 26 July 2015. Jordanian House Speaker Atef Tarawneh praised Abu Zant for his patriotism and dedication while being member of the House. Three days after his death Jordanian King Abdullah II visited Abu Zant's family to extend his condolences.
