= UAE–Israel land corridor =

Middle Eastern trade route

The UAE–Israel land corridor is a primarily land-based trade route which runs from ports in Bahrain and United Arab Emirates across Saudi Arabia and Jordan, into Israel, and Egypt, leading from the Persian Gulf straight to Israel's seaports. The corridor was officially established on 13 December 2023.

== Background ==
=== Abraham Accords ===
On 15 September 2020, after the Abraham Accords, a bilateral agreement on Arab–Israeli normalization between Israel and the United Arab Emirates and between Israel and Bahrain, and in the midst of the normalization talks between Saudi Arabia and Israel Mediated by the United States, the land transportation corridor project was launched.

=== Red Sea crisis ===
on 28 November 2023, following Israel's ongoing bombardment and raid of the Gaza Strip, Yemen's Houthis launched multiple attacks on ships allegedly moving towards Israel via the Red Sea in support of the Palestinians. The leader of the Houthis, Abdul-Malik al-Houthi, warned the United States against intervening in support of Israel, threatening that such an intervention would Drone and missile attacks would have a retaliatory response. The Houthis announced that the condition for ending their attacks in the Red Sea is a ceasefire in the Gaza war and an end to Israel's Blockade of the Gaza Strip. The Red Sea crisis in maritime trade, ongoing attacks by Houthi militias on cargo ships, and retaliatory naval and air strikes against the Houthis by US-led Multinational Operation Prosperity Guardian, Israel's shipping and logistics companies have been forced to bypass the Red Sea and use alternative land routes to transport goods from the Far East to Israel.

== Establishment ==
On 7 July 2023 Ynet reported that after the Abraham Accords and the development of relations with Arab countries, Israel and the United States are working on a project to establish a continuous trade land bridge connecting the Persian Gulf directly to the seaports of Israel via Jordan, Israel, Saudi Arabia, and the United Arab Emirates. It is set to expand to Bahrain and Oman later, Ynet reported.

On 13 December 2023 Israeli officials said, the UAE-Israel land corridor to deliver cargo from the Persian Gulf States to Israel through Saudi Arabia and Jordan is up and running as an alternative route following the Yemeni group's attacks in the Red Sea. this trade corridor connects from the port of Dubai in the United Arab Emirates or Bahrain, across Saudi Arabia and Jordan, into Israel, and Egypt, leading from the Persian Gulf straight to Israel's seaports. Hanan Fridman, founder at Trucknet Enterprise, an Eilat-based Israeli startup that provides logistics technology for the Arab companies that make the journey, announced that they established an alternative overland trade route e to transfer goods and bypass the Houthi crisis in the Red Sea. Friedman said that while "sharp demand" for land cargo services grew exponentially in the wake of the Red Sea crisis, the "Land Connectivity by Trucks" project was operational before the Israel-Hamas war on 7 October. This corridor made it possible to transport cargo between Dubai Gulf and the port of Haifa in Israel, while significantly reducing cost and time. In such a way that a 14-day sea journey has been reduced to only four days through this land route.

== Controversy ==
The Jordanian government denies the existence of the land corridor. The journalist Hiba Abu Taha was imprisoned for 9 months after one of her articles alleged Jordanian-Israeli collaboration regarding trade access amid the Houthi blockade.

== See also ==
- Arab League
- Arab League and the Arab–Israeli conflict
- Foreign relations of the Arab League
- Foreign relations of Israel
