= Al Ghad =

Jordanian newspaper

- The front page of Al Ghad on Sunday 31 October 2010
- Native name: الغد (Arabic)
- Type: Daily newspaper
- Format: Print, online
- Owner(s): Al Faridah Specialized Printing
- Founded: 1 August 2004; 21 years ago
- Political alignment: Liberal
- Language: Arabic and English
- Headquarters: Amman
- OCLC number: 234713902
- Website: Al Ghad website

Al Ghad (Arabic: الغد 'Tomorrow') is the first independent Arabic daily national newspaper published in Jordan. It is privately owned and headquartered in Amman.

== History and profile ==
Al Ghad was founded by Mohammad Alayyan in August 2004. Alayyan is also the chairman of the Al Faridah Specialized Printing, publisher of the daily. As of 2005 Emad Hmoud was the editor-in-chief of the paper.

Militants stormed the paper's headquarters in November 2011, attacking employees. Editor-in-chief Mustafa Saleh's resignation the following month coincided with the dismissal of Jumana Ghunaimat, editor-and-chief of the state-owned al-Rai, by then-Minister of State for Media Affairs and Communication, Rakan Al-Majali. Its editor-in-chief was Jumana Ghunaimat who was appointed to the post in late 2011, through 2018. As of 2011 Mohammed Sweidan was the managing editor of the daily.

In addition to its print version, it launched online version which has reached a significant number of readers. It was the 10th most visited website for 2010 in the MENA region.

The paper was awarded three prizes in the categories of Best Design, Best Front Page, and Best Electronic Portal in the 7th Asia Media Awards, organized by the World Association of Newspapers and News Publishers (IFRA). In 2018, Al Ghad was named the most influential Arabic newspaper website by Industry Arabic.

== Content ==
The newspaper is organized into five sections:

- Al Ghad Al Urduni (الغد الأردني): for local news of Jordan
- Arabs and the World ( العرب والعالم): covers international and regional news
- Al Tahaddi (التحدي): for sports news
- Economy (اقتصاد): covers international economics and business news
- Hyatuna (حياتنا): covers health and lifestyle news

== See also ==
- List of newspapers in Jordan
