= Politics of Jordan =

The politics of Jordan take place in an authoritarian context where power is centralized in the hands of King Abdullah II. Aside from the King, the most powerful institutions in Jordan, politics are the coercive apparatus (military, police, intelligence service); the cabinet government which the king appoints; and the public bureaucracy. The popularly elected lower house of parliament has little meaningful influence on major policy decisions in Jordan.

Formally, Jordanian politics takes places in a framework of a parliamentary monarchy, whereby the Prime Minister of Jordan is head of government, and of a multi-party system. Jordan is a constitutional monarchy based on the constitution promulgated on January 8, 1952. The king exercises his power through the government he appoints which is responsible before the Parliament.

Writing in 2026, Temple University professor Sean Yom writes, "the monarchy preserves power through a model of liberalized autocracy. Officials tolerate some dissent but repress the loudest critics, even online. They champion parliamentary elections, but only after hobbling opposition parties. They also issue never-ending promises of democratic reform."

King Abdullah II of Jordan has been sovereign since the death of his father, King Hussein, in 1999. Jafar Hassan has been prime minister since 15 September 2024.

== Executive branch ==
Main office-holders
| Office | Name | Party | Since |
|---|---|---|---|
| King | Abdullah II | | 7 February 1999 |
| Prime Minister | Jafar Hassan | Independent | 15 September 2024 |

The Constitution of Jordan vests executive authority in the king and in his cabinet. The king signs and executes or vetoes all laws. The king may also suspend or dissolve parliament, and shorten or lengthen the term of session. A veto by the king may be overridden by a two-thirds vote of both houses of parliament at his discretion, most recently in November 2009. The king appoints and may dismiss all judges by decree, approves amendments to the constitution after passing by both parliaments, declares war and acts as the supreme leader of the armed forces. Cabinet decisions, court judgments, and the national currency are issued in his name. The Cabinet, led by a prime minister, was formerly appointed by the king, but following the 2011 Jordanian protests, King Abdullah agreed to a prime minister selected by and responsible to the Chamber of Deputies on matters of general policy, including the composition of cabinet. A two-thirds vote of "no confidence" by the Chamber can force the cabinet to resign.

== Legislative branch ==
Legislative power rests in the bicameral National Assembly. The National Assembly (Majlis al-Umma) has two chambers. The Chamber of Deputies (Majlis al-Nuwaab) has 138 members, elected for a four-year term in single-seat constituencies with 15 seats reserved for women by a special electoral college, nine for Christians and three for Chechens/Circassians. While the Chamber of Deputies is elected by the people, its main legislative abilities are limited to approving, rejecting, or amending legislation with little power to initiate laws. The Assembly of Senators (Majlis al-Aayan) has 65 members appointed by the King for a four-year term. The Assembly of Senators is responsible to the Chamber of Deputies and can be removed by a "vote of no confidence".

Political factions or blocs in the Jordanian parliament change with each parliamentary election and typically involve one of the following affiliations; a democratic Marxist/Socialist faction, a mainstream liberal faction, a moderate-pragmatic faction, a mainstream conservative faction, and an extreme conservative faction (such as the Islamic Action Front).

The Jordanian Chamber of Deputies is known for brawls between its members, including acts of violence and the use of weapons. In September 2013 Representative Talal al-Sharif tried to shoot one of his colleagues with an assault rifle while at the parliamentary premises.

== Judicial branch ==
The judiciary is completely independent from the other two branches of the government. The constitution provides for three categories of courts—civil (in this case meaning "regular"), religious, and special. Regular courts consist of both civil and criminal varieties at the first level—First Instance or Conciliation Courts, second level—Appelette or Appeals Courts, and the Cassation Court which is the highest judicial authority in the kingdom. There are two types of religious courts: Sharia courts which enforce the provisions of Islamic law and civil status, and tribunals of other religious communities officially recognized in Jordan.

== Political conditions ==
King Hussein ruled Jordan from 1953 to 1999, surviving a number of challenges to his rule, drawing on the loyalty of his military, and serving as a symbol of unity and stability for both the Jordanians and Palestinian communities in Jordan. King Hussein ended martial law in 1989 and ended suspension on political parties that was initiated following the loss of the West Bank to Israel and in order to preserve the status quo in Jordan. In 1989 and 1993, Jordan held free and fair parliamentary elections. Controversial changes in the election law led Islamist parties to boycott the 1997, 2011 and 2013 elections.

King Abdullah II succeeded his father Hussein following the latter's death in February 1999. Abdullah moved quickly to reaffirm Jordan's peace treaty with Israel and its relations with the United States. Abdullah, during the first year in power, refocused the government's agenda on economic reform.

Jordan's continuing structural economic difficulties, burgeoning population, and more open political environment led to the emergence of a variety of political parties. Moving toward greater independence, Jordan's parliament has investigated corruption charges against several regime figures and has become the major forum in which differing political views, including those of political Islamists, are expressed.

On February 1, 2011, it was announced that King Abdullah had dismissed his government. This has been interpreted as a pre-emptive move in the context of the Tunisian Jasmine Revolution and unfolding events in nearby Egypt.

== Decentralization ==
King Abdullah II and the Jordanian Government began the process of decentralization, with the Madaba governorate as the pilot project, on the regional level dividing the nation into three regions: North, Central, and South. The Greater Amman Municipality will be excluded from the plan but it will set up a similar decentralization process. Each region will have an elected council that will handle the political, social, legal, and economic affairs of its area. This decentralization process is part of Jordan's Democratization Program.

== Corruption ==
Jordan ranked 47th out of 180 nations in the Corruption Perceptions Index. The Constitution of Jordan states that no member of Parliament can have any financial or business dealings with the government and no member of the royal family can be in the government. Corruption remains a problem in Jordan. Corruption in Jordan takes the form of nepotism, favoritism, and bribery.

The Anti-Corruption Commission examines corruption cases and then referred to the judiciary for legal action. A 2026 study found that anti-corruption efforts in Jordan primarily target petty corruption by low-level bureaucrats rather than grand corruption by powerful regime elites.

== 2018 Protests ==
The 2018 Jordanian protests started as a general strike organized by more than 30 trade unions on 30 May 2018 after the government of Hani Mulki submitted a new tax law to Parliament. The bill followed IMF-backed measures to tackle Jordan's growing public debt.

The day following the strike on 31 May, the government raised fuel and electricity prices responding to an increase in international oil prices, which led to more public discontent. On 1 June King Abdullah intervened and ordered the freeze of the price hikes.

The protests continued for four days until Mulki submitted his resignation to the King on 4 June, and Omar Razzaz, his education minister, became prime minister. Protests only ceased after Razzaz announced his intention of withdrawing the new tax bill.

== Administrative divisions ==
Administratively, Jordan is divided into twelve governorates (muhafazat, singular—muhafazah), each headed by a governor appointed by the king. They are the sole authorities for all government departments and development projects in their respective areas:

1. Ajlun
2. Aqaba
3. Balqa
4. Karak
5. Mafraq
6. Amman
7. Tafilah
8. Zarqa
9. Irbid
10. Jerash
11. Ma'an
12. Madaba

== International organization participation ==
ABEDA, ACC, AFESD, AL, AMF, CAEU, CCC, CTBTO, EBRD, ESCWA, FAO, G-77, IAEA, IBRD, ICAO, ICC, ICC, ICFTU, ICRM, IDA, IDB, IFAD, IFC, IFRCS, ILO, IMF, IMO, Intelsat, Interpol, IOC, IOM (observer), ISO (correspondent), ITU, NAM, OIC, OPCW, OSCE (partner), PCA, UN, UNCTAD, UNESCO, UNIDO, UNMIBH, UNMIK, UNMOP, UNMOT, UNOMIG, UNRWA, UNTAET, UN Tourism, UPU, WFTU, WHO, WIPO, WMO, WTO, WTrO

== See also ==
- Jordanian political satire
