= Al Arab Al Yawm =

Jordanian newspaper

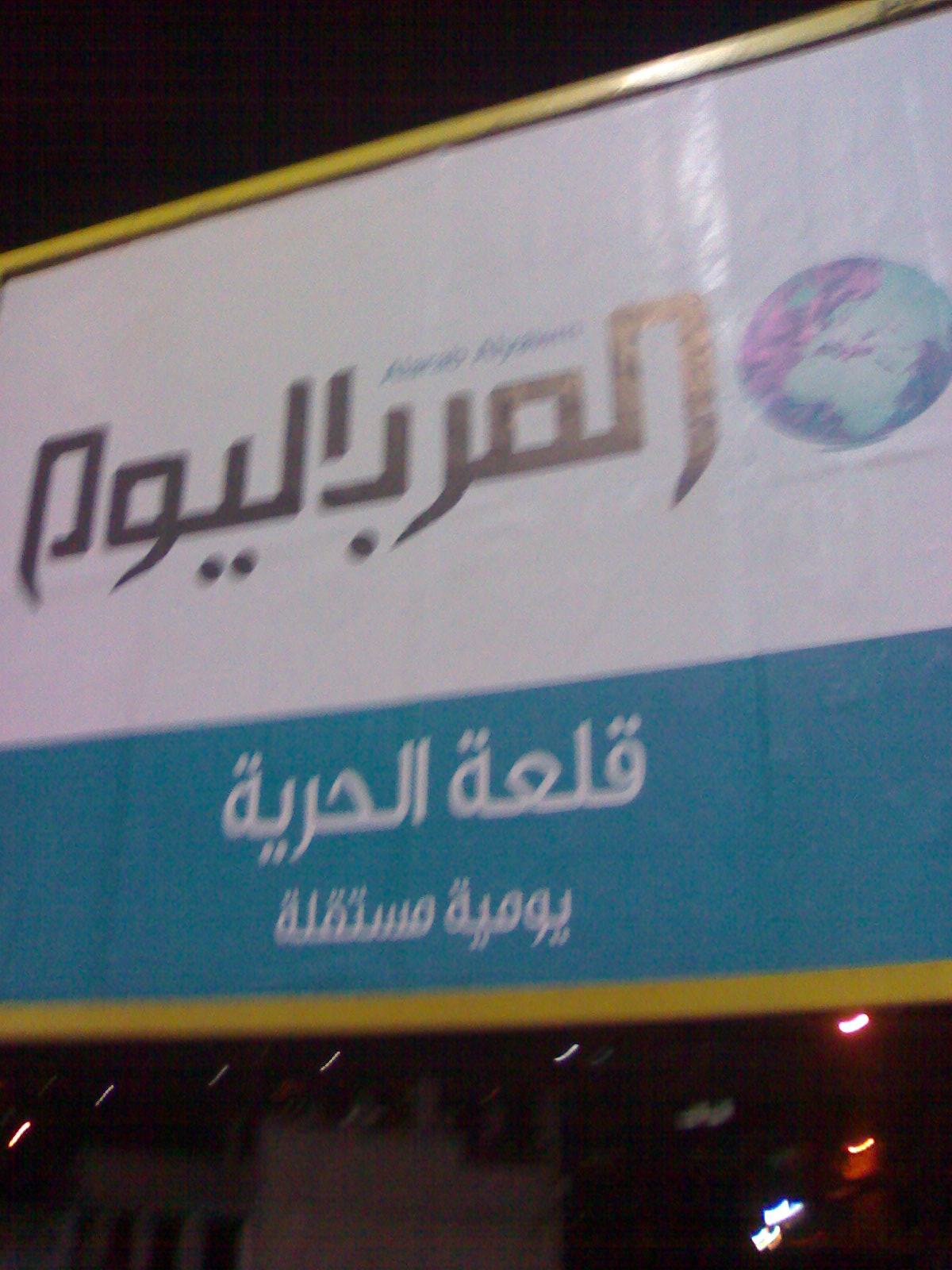
- A sign for Al Arab Al Yawm newspaper seen in Russeifa
- Type: Daily newspaper
- Owner: Elyas Jreisat
- Editor: Muhammad Kaaoush
- Founded: 1996; 30 years ago
- Language: Arabic
- Headquarters: Amman
- Website: Official website

Al Arab Al Yawm (Arabic: العرب اليوم; lit. 'Arabs Today') is a privately owned daily newspaper in Arabic language, headquartered in Amman, Jordan.

== History and profile ==
Al Arab Al Yawm was established in 1996. The daily described itself as an independent publication. Azzam Yunis is one of the former editors-in-chief of the paper who was detained in 1999 after several articles written by Abu Zant were published in the newspaper. As of 2009, Tahir Al Adwan also served in the post.

Rajaei Lemasher, a Jordanian politician who served as deputy prime minister, was the owner of the daily. It was sold to Elias Jreisat in 2011. Fahd Khitan served as the editor-in-chief of the paper until 22 November 2011 when he and other members of the editorial board resigned due to disagreement with Elias Jreisat. In late 2011, Samih Maaytah became the chairman of paper's editorial board and Muhammad Kaaoush was appointed editor-in-chief.

In 2003, the estimated circulation of the daily was 30,000 copies. The paper's online version was the 49th most visited website for 2010 in the MENA region.

Following the publication of an article which criticized the government's crackdown the corruption and protests in Al Tafila the Jordanian Royal Court asked the newspaper to delete the article appeared in its website in March 2012. The daily was suspended for 90 days in July 2013 due to financial problems and resumed publishing on 8 December 2013.

== See also ==
- List of newspapers in Jordan
