= 2023 cybercrime law in Jordan =

On August 12, 2023, King Abdullah II ratified a new cybercrime law, Law No. 17 of 2023, which took effect on September 13, 2023. The law was reported as being used against pro-Palestine protestors. This new bill, consisting of 41 articles, sought to replace the Cybercrime Law No. 27 of 2015.

Furthermore, the enactment of the Cybercrime Law No. 17 of 2023 has sparked widespread controversy both locally and internationally. Critics, including legal experts, human rights advocates, and members of the Jordanian parliament, argue that the law's vague terminology and severe penalties undermine freedom of speech and expression. High-profile figures such as Deputy Leader of the Opposition, Saleh Al Armouti, and MP Hassan Al Riyati have openly condemned the law, describing it as a regression from democratic principles. In addition, international human rights organizations and bodies, including Human Rights Watch and the European Union, have expressed alarm, warning that the law threatens civil liberties and tightens government control over the internet.

== Background ==
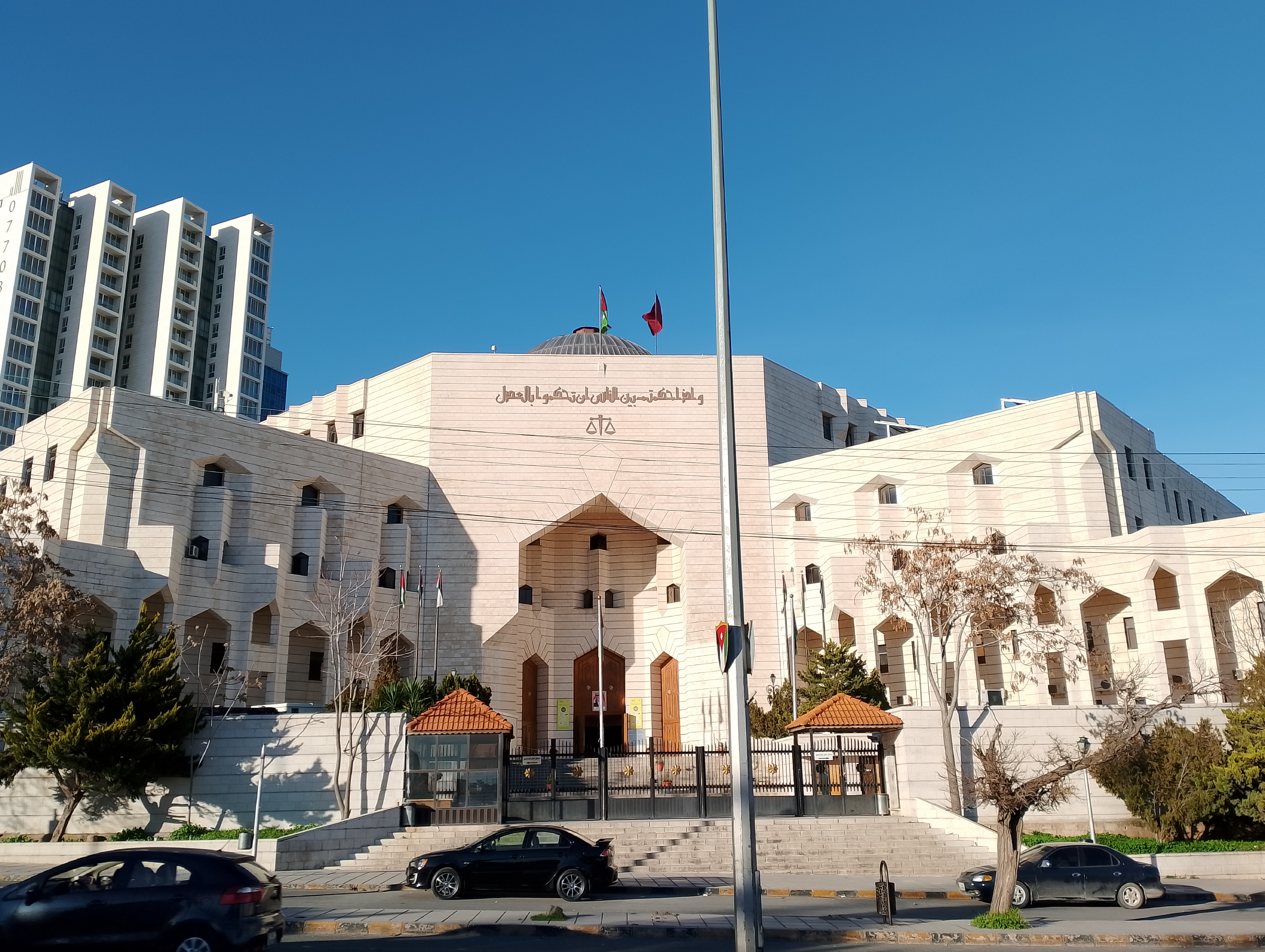
Palace of Justice, Amman.

In July 2023, the Jordanian Government proposed a cybercrime bill that criminalises online speech deemed to “expose public morals” (Article 14), “stir up strife” (Article 17), “insult religion” (Article 17), constitute “character assassination” (Article 16), “calls for or justification of violence” (Article 17), "false news" (Article 15), defamation (Article 20), or hate speech (Article 17). The draft consisted of 41 articles and was meant to replace the previous Cybercrime Law No. 27 of 2015. By the end of the month, the lower house of Parliament and Senate passed the law with a few amendments and on August 12, 2023, it was ratified by the King.

The swift passage of the law did not allow for a public debate to take place regarding the law and its provisions and neither allowed for a dialogue with political parties or civil society organisations. In 2017, the government proposed amendments to the Cybercrime Law No. 27 of 2015 and received widespread criticism forcing it to withdraw the amendments.

In the context of multiple prosecutions of critical writers and journalists, such as the Jordanian satirist Ahmad Hasan Al Zoubi, this law was enacted. However, according to Prime Minister, Bisher Al Khasawneh, the law's enactment was necessary to combat online crimes that violated people's privacy and caused societal friction.

Noteworthy to mention, Jordan has been previously criticized for its restrictive laws and public policies. According to Freedom House's recent evaluation of political rights and civil liberties, Jordan is a "non-free" country. Reporters Without Borders also indicated that Jordan fell 26 places (from 120th to 146th) in their 2023 World Press Freedom Index. Around 300 websites, social media platforms, and applications were already banned across the country. The social media platform TikTok was also banned in December 2022.

== Provisions ==
The Cybercrime Law No. 17 of 2023 consists of 41 articles and criminalizes online-related activities that include but are not limited to:

- gaining unauthorised access to information networks, or government data;
- creating false social media accounts or websites or applications and falsely attributing them to legal or natural persons;
- hacking information;
- spreading misinformation and hate speech and insulting religious beliefs;
- using unauthorized means for online payments;
- publishing pornographic materials using information networks;
- promoting prostitution and immoral sexual behaviour;
- publishing information on how to manufacture weapons, ammunition or explosives.

The penalties range from imprisonment to fines or both depending on the cybercrime. Prison terms range from one week to three years and the fines range from 300 Jordanian Dinar to JD 75.000 (423 US Dollar to 105,000 US Dollar). As per Yahya Choucair, expert in media laws, “anyone who reads the provisions of Articles 15, 16, and 17 of the Cybercrime Law will realize that the severe fines, which reach 70,000 Jordanian dinars [Approx. 98.000 US Dollars], completely nullify the right to freedom of opinion and expression”.

== Controversy ==
=== Local controversy ===
The draft law was criticized by legal experts, human rights advocates, and various government officials, MPs, and Ministers. According to Deputy Leader of the Opposition, Saleh Al Armouti, “Jordan will become a big jail.” Al Armouti added that the law “goes against reason and intellect and reneges on reforms,” and that “the government is trying to limit people from defending themselves while reinforcing customary provisions that harm the nation and its citizens.” Additionally, MP Hassan Al Riyati described the law as a “coup against democracy in Jordan,” and MP Yanal Freihat criticized the law's "irrational and unrealistic" penalties. The Jordan Press Association issued an official statement rejecting several amendments to the Draft Cybercrime Law, stating that it “contributes to silencing people and restricting press and public freedoms.” Research revealed that the law is largely perceived negatively, being depicted as a "SILENCER, BARBED WIRES, and HANDCUFFS," which implies that it limits freedom of speech and suggests that citizens are viewed as potential criminals under the new law.

The draft law was criticised from legal experts, [human rights advocates, and from various government officials, MPs, and Ministers. According to Deputy Leader of the Opposition, Saleh Al Armouti, “Jordan will become a big jail.” Al Armouti added that the law “goes against reason and intellect and reneges on reforms,” and with it, “the government is trying to limit people from defending themselves while reinforcing customary provisions that harm the nation and its citizens.” Additionally, MP, Hassan Al Riyati, described the law as being a “coup against democracy in Jordan”. MP, Yanal Freihat, also criticised the law and its imposed "irrational and unrealistic" penalties. Similarly, the board of the Jordan Press Association issued an official statement expressing its rejection of several amendments to the Draft Cybercrime Law, and stated that “it contributes to silencing people and restricting press and public freedoms.”

Hundreds of people went out to the streets on Friday 28 July 2023, to protest the cybercrime draft law and called for the government to resign. The protestors included civil society organisations, political parties and public figures. Moreover, many journalists and social media influencers deleted their online accounts in protest against the House of Representatives's approval of the draft. Also, many activists launched online campaigns demanding the withdrawal of the draft law. The online campaigns were launched under the following hashtags:

#دولة_مش_سجن

(A country not a prison)

#قانون_الجرائم_الالكترونية

(The Cybercrime Law)

#إسحبوا_قانون_الجرائم_الإلكترونية

(Withdraw the Cybercrime Law)

=== International controversy ===
International controversy regarding the law also started before it was ratified. On July 24, 2023, Human Rights Watch, Access Now, ARTICLE 19, and 11 other organizations expressed concern and urged the Jordanian government to immediately withdraw the proposed "draconian" cybercrimes law as it threatens "freedom of expression, the right to information, and the right to privacy, as well as tight[ens] government control over the internet". According to the aforementioned human rights organisations, the law is problematic because:

1. It employs extremely general and ambiguous terminology, such as: “promoting, instigating aiding or inciting immorality”, “character assassination”; “ inciting sedition or undermining national unity”; and “contempt for religions”, etc.
2. It impedes the right to free speech and information access, and exacerbates internet censorship. For instance, Article 24 criminalizes publishing information on law enforcement officials or publicly criticizing them preventing law enforcement officials or governmental authorities from being held accountable. This contradicts with the international freedom of expression standards of the International Covenant on Civil and Political Rights, which Jordan has ratified and states that “a norm, to be characterized as a ‘law’, must be formulated with sufficient precision to enable an individual to regulate his or her conduct accordingly and it must be made accessible to the public. A law may not confer unfettered discretion for the restriction of freedom of expression on those charged with its execution.”
3. It would make online privacy less secure. For instance, Article 12 criminalizes “circumvent[ing] the IP address by using a fictitious address or an address belonging to a third party, or by any other means, with the intent of committing a crime or preventing its discovery” forcing people to choose between being able to freely express their thoughts online and maintaining the security of their identity. Not to mention, it hinders the work of human rights defenders and investigative journalists, who rely on VPNs and proxies to carry their work, and exposes them to arbitrary arrests.
4. It implements new social media regulations. For instance, Article 37 forces social media accounts that have more than 100.000 subscriber to establish offices in the country to receive governmental and judicial requests. Noncompliance to this would penalize users with slowing down the internet in what is known as bandwidth throttling.

The US State Department also criticised the Law in an official statement and warned of its effect on the online and offline freedom of expression, political reform efforts, and digital economy.

The European Union issued a statement maintaining that the provisions of the law "depart from international human rights standards and could result in limiting freedom of expression online and offline". It also urged the Jordanian government to ensure full respect to fundamental freedoms while implementing the law.

The United Nations High Commissioner for Human Rights also criticized the legislation and its swift enactment which raised concerns regarding its transparency and participation. It also stated that the law's articles "fail to comply with international human rights law requirements of legality, legitimate aim, necessity and proportionality for restrictions on the right to freedom of expression".

=== LGBTQ+ ===
According to Human Rights Watch, the Cybercrime Law is a "disaster for LGBT people". Lorena Stella Martini, Jordan researcher at the European Council on Foreign Relations, maintained, "the new law de facto criminalizes the online activities of the Jordanian LGBTQ community, with broad repercussions on offline life as a whole". According to a Jordanian activist, “The new law will destroy all forms of LGBTQ+ expression online” and intensify “interference in people's private lives.” The vague terminology such as "pornographic" in Article 13 could lead to arresting individuals for content that expresses various sexualities or gender identities. The same goes for other vague terms such as “expose public morals,” “debauchery,” and “seduction” which are listed in Article 14, allow for abuse, and could easily restrict LGBTQ+ content by falsely linking immorality to a variety of sexual orientations.

=== Pro-Palestine protests ===
Since the start of Israel's war on Gaza in October 2023, daily pro-Palestine protests have been taking place near the Israeli Embassy, in Amman's Al Rabyieh neighbourhood, and on Fridays, huge demonstrations have been staged in downtown Amman.

According to Amnesty International, at least a thousand protester, between October and December, was arrested and charged with the 2023 Cybercrimes Law, "for social media posts expressing pro-Palestinian sentiments, criticizing the authorities’ peace or economic deals with Israel or calling for public strikes and protests." The crackdown on activists and protesters has been carried out by security and intelligence forces. According to an anonymous Jordanian researcher who reported to Al Jazeera, many of these protesters were detained "for a day or a weekend, but now some people have been detained for months for a tweet, a retweet, or even sharing a private story on Instagram to twist their arm and to say: ‘Quiet down and don't go down on the street.’” Activists and protesters started reporting on people who were arbitrarily arrested for their exercising their rights to freedom of expression and peaceful assembly or simply for their chants under the hashtags:

#الحرية_لمعتقلي_الرأي

(Freedom for prisoners of opinion)

#لا_لتكميم_الافواه

(No to muzzling mouths)

#الحرية_لمعتقلي_دعم_غزة

(Freedom for the detainees supporting Gaza)

Amnesty International documented the cases of five political activists who were dteianed and charged under the cybercrime law for “inciting sedition, strife, and hatred”, “sending, re-sending, or publishing libelous or slanderous information”, “defaming an official body” and “publishing pictures, information, or news of law enforcement officials”. Many of these detainees were not only denied access to lawyers but were only released upon signing a pledge to stop protesting contrary to international standards.

On February 6, 2024, Human Rights watch (HRW) published a report interviewing people who have been artbitrarily detained, harassed and summoned by the General Intelligence Directorate under the new cybercrimes law. According to the HRW report, one was detained and sentenced to three months in jail for three tweets he published in October, in addition to a 5,000 Jordanian Dinar (Approx. US$7,000) fine. A woman was also detained for publishing a video on X that shows police breaking up the pro-Palestine protests and reported being repeatedly asked by the governor “is Gaza worth all of this?”, “You sit in your home, you eat, drink, sleep, and go to the protest and go back home and we make this safe for you.”

Nevertheless, as Lama Fakih, Middle East director at Human Rights Watch noted, the current regional crisis is used by Jordan as a guise to restrict Jordanians' freedom to expression and "recent cases have proven that [the Jordanian] authorities have and will continue to abuse vague provisions of the cybercrimes law.”
