= Al Anbat =

Al Anbat (الأنباط)
- Native name: جريدة الأنباط
- Type: Daily newspaper
- Format: Tabloid
- Publisher: Al Anbat Press
- Editor: Rula Al Hroob
- Founded: 2005; 21 years ago
- Language: Arabic
- Headquarters: Amman, Jordan
- Website: Official website

The Al Anbat (Arabic: الأنباط; lit. 'Nabataeans') is an independent Arabic daily national newspaper, published in Jordan, and headquartered in Amman.

== History and profile ==
Al Anbat was started in May 2005 as a 28-page daily political paper. The paper was founded by Riyadh Al Hroob and his wife, Rula Al Hroob. Riyadh is the publisher while Rula is the editor-in-chief of the paper.

Al Anbat is published in tabloid format. It was first daily in Jordan published with this format.

On 28 September 2005 the paper's information office was attacked by three masked people.

== See also ==
- List of newspapers in Jordan
