= Arab Journalism Award =

Journalism Award by Dubai Press in UAE

- Country: UAE
- Hosted by: Dubai Press Club
- Website: dpc.org.ae/en

The Arab Journalism Award (AJA) (Arabic: جائزة الصحافة العربية) launched in 1999, by Dubai Press Club, The award is given each year by Sheikh Mohammed bin Rashid Al Maktoum during the Arab Media Forum. It plays a role in motivating Arab media and encouraged Arab journalists to adopt innovation and creativity to develop their work. The award's main goal is to reward talent, inspire, and stimulate creativity. It is also aimed at enhancing the constructive role of the press in serving the community.

== Categories ==
The Arab Journalism Award is awarded in 14 categories which include:

- Investigative reporting
- Young talent in journalism
- Photojournalism
- Economic journalism
- Outstanding cartoon artwork
- Sports journalism
- Best press interview
- Best columnist
- Media personality of the year
- Political journalism
- Cultural journalism
- Smart journalism
- Humanitarian journalism.

== Winners ==
- Omaya Joha

=== Arab Media Award 2024 ===
- Digital Media Award for Best News Platform: Cairo 24 website.
- Digital Media Award for Best Economic Platform: “Information Direct” website.
- Digital Media Award for Best Sports Platform: “Sport 360” platform.
- Visual Media Award for Best Economic Program: “Kalam Aswaq” program.
- Visual Media Award for Best Social Program: “Al-Liwan” program.
- Visual Media Award for Best Cultural Program: “Doroob” program.
- Visual Media Award for Best Documentary: “Behind the Scenes... Salt on the Wound” Asharq News.
- Visual Media Award for Best Sports Program: “ON Stadium” program.
