= Omaya Joha =

Palestinian artist and cartoonist

- أمية جحا
- Born: 2 February 1972 (age 54); Gaza City, Palestine
- Education: Al-Azhar University
- Known for: Cartoons, writing
- Spouses: Rami Khader Saad; Wael Aqilan

Omaya Joha (Arabic: أمية جحا) is a Palestinian political cartoonist and journalist. She is the first female cartoonist in the Arab world working in daily political newspapers and news sites, including for Al Jazeera Arabic. She is also the recipient of the Arab Journalism Award (2001) in the United Arab Emirates.

== Early life and education ==
Omaya Joha was born in Gaza City on 2 February 1972. She graduated in 1995 with honors from the mathematics department of Al-Azhar University.

She was married to Rami Khader Saad, a Hamas commander killed by Israeli forces in 2003. She later married Wael Aqilan, who died in May 2009 when he was prevented from leaving the Gaza Strip for medical treatment.

== Career ==
She worked as a mathematics teacher for three years, then resigned in 1999 to devote herself to technical work. Since September 1999, she has worked for the daily newspaper Alquds. She has worked in other daily political newspapers and news websites, as well as chaired the cartoon company, Juha Ton. Joha is the first cartoonist in Palestine and the Arab world to work for a daily political newspaper.

She is a member of the Naji Al-Ali Association in Palestine. She participated in many local exhibitions.

=== Controversy ===
On 11 January 2016, Facebook deleted her official page and all her cartoons on the grounds that it had received notifications of offensive drawings. The Anti-Defamation League (ADL) a New York-based international Jewish non-governmental organization and advocacy group has labeled Joha's work as "anti-semitic cartoons".

== Awards ==
She won many awards, including:

- 1999, Palestinian Ministry of Culture Award for Cartoons
- 2002, Arab Journalism Award by the Dubai Press Club
- 2007, Creative Women Award for Cartoons
- 2010, Grand prize of "Naji Al-Ali International Cartoon Competition" by the Solidarity Association with the Palestinian People in Turkey

== See also ==
- Carlos Latuff
