= Dubai Press Club =

UAE government office

- Abbreviation: DPC
- Formation: November 1999
- Headquarters: Dubai Media City, Dubai, United Arab Emirates
- Region served: Arab world
- Official language: Arabic; English
- Executive Director: Maitha Buhumaid
- Parent organization: Government of Dubai
- Website: www.dpc.org.ae

Dubai Press Club (Arabic: نادي دبي للصحافة) is a part of the Government of Dubai Media Office founded in November 1999 by Mohammed bin Rashid Al Maktoum and is based in Dubai Media City in Dubai, United Arab Emirates. It launched the Arab Media Forum and the Arab Journalism Award.

== Membership ==
Membership at the Dubai Press Club is open to all practicing journalists from within and outside the UAE, as well as photojournalists, media students and members of management teams at media organisations.

Members have access to global information resources and a unique opportunity to join a wide network of media professionals from around the world. In addition to providing professional support to members, the Dubai Press Club organises a range of social events ranging from tours to sporting events.

== Awards ==
- Media Creativity Awards by the Arab Thought Foundation (December 2010)

== See also ==
- Arab Journalism Award
