= Philadelphia University (Jordan) =

University in Amman, Jordan

- جامعة فيلادلفيا
- Motto: الطريق إلى المستقبل
- Motto in English: The Way to the Future
- Type: Private
- Established: 1989
- President: Prof. Abdulla Al-Jarrah
- Academic staff: 250
- Students: 6900
- Location: Amman, Jordan
- Website: www.philadelphia.edu.jo

Philadelphia University is a university in Amman, Jordan. "Philadelphia" is the former name of Amman. The university was founded in 1989. It is located 20 kilometres (12 mi) out of Amman on Jarash Road.

== Ranking ==
In 2016, the university was ranked 1,994 worldwide, and 31 in the Arab world, and 4 on the level of all Jordanian universities and the first in the Jordanian private universities, according to the Webometrics Rating.

== Faculties and departments ==
Philadelphia University is organized in eight faculties:

- Arts
- Science
- Nursing
- Engineering
- Law
- Pharmacy
- Information Technology
- Administrative & Financial Sciences

=== Faculty of Engineering ===

The Faculty of Engineering was founded at the beginning of establishing the university. It contains 24 laboratories provided with the latest devices and technology.

The Faculty of Engineering is divided into departments:

- Mechanical Engineering
- Electrical Engineering
- Electronics and Communication Engineering
- Computer Engineering
- Mechatronics Engineering
- Civil Engineering
- Architecture
- Renewable Energy Engineering
- Web Engineering

=== Faculty of Arts ===
- Arabic Language and Literature
- English Language and Literature
- Psychological Counseling
- Journalism
- Graphic Design
- Interior Design
- Development Studies

=== Faculty of Administrative and Financial Sciences ===
- Accounting
- Business Administration
- Banking and Finance
- Marketing
- Hotels and Tourism Management
- Hospital Management
- Business Systems and Networking Management

=== Faculty of Information Technology ===
- Computer Science
- Software Engineering
- Management Information Systems

=== Faculty of Pharmacy ===
- Pharmacy

=== Faculty of Science ===
- Mathematics
- Biotechnology and Genetic Engineering

=== Faculty of Nursing ===
- Nursing

=== Faculty of Law ===
- Law

== See also ==
- List of Islamic educational institutions
