= Kharabeesh =

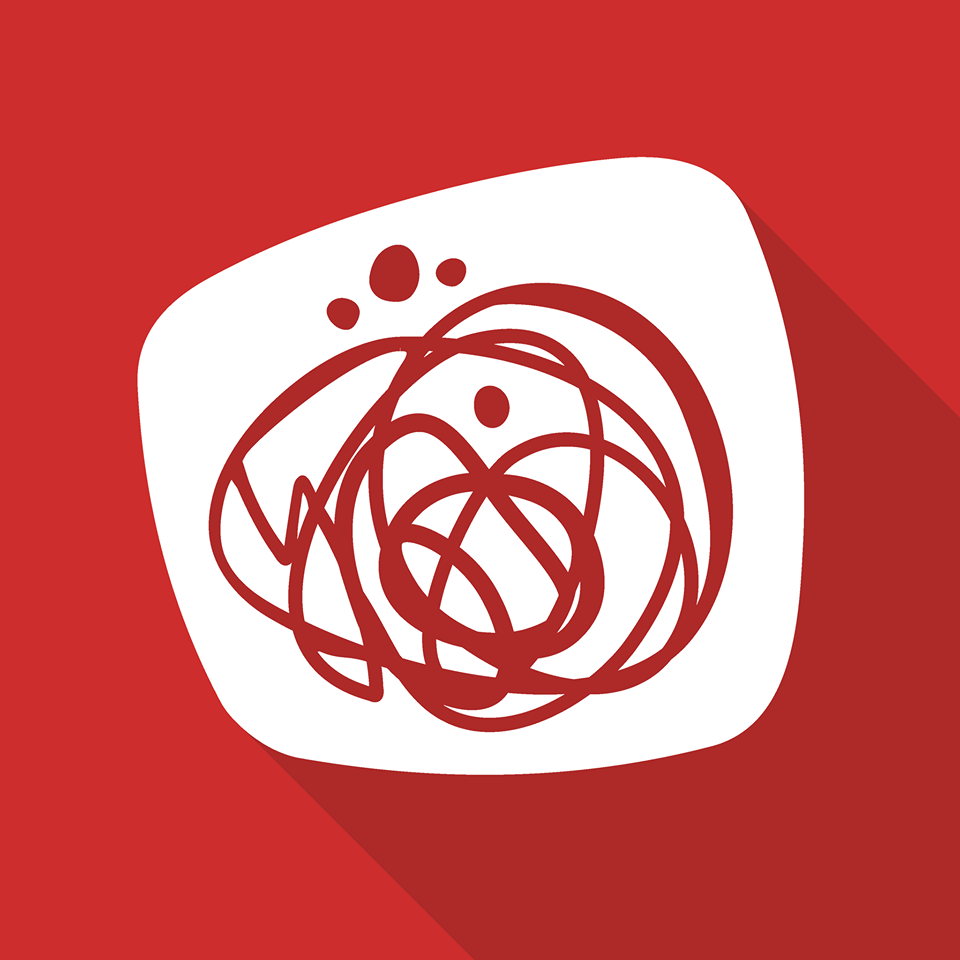
Kharabeesh logo

Kharabeesh (Arabic: خرابيش [xaraːbiːʃ]) is a Jordan-based company that produces Arabic-language animated cartoons, music videos and talk shows that generally tackle political issues in the Arab world. The top four most-viewed Kharabeesh videos posted on YouTube have more than 2 million views. All views feature either Housni Mubarak or Muammar Gaddafi. "Karabeesh" means "scribbles" in Arabic. The political cartoons produced by Kharabeesh have received international attention during and after the Arab Spring revolutions.

Kharabeesh is part of the Think Arabia media group.

== History ==
=== Founding ===
Kharabeesh was originally co-founded by Jordanian blogger Wael Attili, Mohammad Asfour and Wafa Nabulsi, in 2005. Their aim was to produce satirical animated videos and distribute them solely through new media platforms such as Facebook, YouTube and Twitter. Attili traces the genesis of the idea for Kharabeesh to 2005-2006, when the founders felt that there was “a lack and a need for Arabic content” in the world of social media and online videos. Initially operating out of a small office in Jabal Amman, Amman, Kharabeesh has now grown to become an open space where illustrators, animators, designers work collaboratively. A profile of Kharabeesh and Attili in the magazine Jordan Business writes that "Attili brought together his college buddies, who were all struggling to manage their own slew of start-ups in the web industry, and decided to form Kharabeesh."

The founders of Kharabeesh originally decided to orient their content along political themes that are salient for most Arabs, as opposed to cultural and social issues that are distinct to each individual country. The Kharabeesh founders also felt that the internet and online media were the ideal platforms on which to tackle these issues, offering more freedom of expression than was available in traditional print media, in which the "ceiling of freedom" is much lower.

When it was initially launched, Kharabeesh, and in order to create a sustainable group of companies to be able to serve each other and form a new concept of partnership in the Arab world, each partner merged their own start-ups in the tech and web fields to create a mother company called Think Arabia with other two partners, Firas Otaibi and Shaher Otaibi. In doing so, Kharabeesh was able to outsource its web and graphic design services to the sister companies in order that each company would in turn assist the others' financial viability.

=== Arab Spring ===
Although Kharabeesh was active before the Arab Spring, the popularity of their political videos during the wave of revolutions in Tunisia, Egypt, and elsewhere in the Arab world pushed the company to a new level of recognition. The popularity of the political cartoons in particular was such that a Tunisian television channel volunteered to translate a video about the flight of deposed Tunisian President Ben Ali from Arabic to Spanish.

=== Mission ===
Currently Kharabeesh CEO, Attili has said that the Kharabeesh script-writing and animation team draws “inspiration from our personal, everyday experiences ... using them to power our sketches and cartoons … That’s what makes them so appealing to people.” Attili is one of Jordan's longest-active bloggers, having begun blogging in 2005.

Attili maintains that Kharabeesh was built out of the idea that “a new creative industry was emerging in the Arab world," and that secret of Kharabeesh's success lies in its emphasis on creativity rather than profit. Although the company sometimes takes individual commissions from clients, most of its work is generated in-house and involves testing the success of ideas in order to determine if potential buyers are interested. According to Attili, creation and execution come before business and funding, saying that the company values “new, funny and edgy mini-cartoon shows designed specifically for the wed audience.”

== Recent features and animations ==
Kharabeesh's cartoons have been compared to JibJab, not only because of their political nature but also their animation style and technique. Kharabeesh shares their techniques on a "KharabeeshWorkshop" channel on YouTube.

=== “Mubarak is high” ===
Between January 30, 2011 and February 1, 2011, Kharabeesh released two animated shorts depicting then Egyptian President Hosni Mubarak addressing the Egyptian people following the ousting of Tunisian President Ben Ali. In the first animated video of the series, which as of April 8, 2012 has over 1,800,000 views on YouTube, Housni Mubarak addresses the Egyptian people in Egyptian Colloquial Arabic, a clear departure from the public speeches he had recently given at the time, which were noted to have been delivered solely in Modern Standard Arabic. The caricatured Mubarak offers trivial solutions to the Egyptian people and pledges not to leave his position, before punched off his podium by a fist representing "the People." In the second video of the series, Mubarak addresses an angry mob, ignoring their chants demanding that he step down. A week later, Kharabeesh launched the third and final video of the series, which shows Mubarak receiving phone calls of congratulations from his counterparts abroad.

Kharabeesh has also produced videos satirizing Syrian President Bashar al-Assad, the Egyptian Supreme Council of the Armed Forces, Angry Birds, and Muammar Gaddafi.

== Market Value ==
According to a statement by Wael Attili to the Saudi channel Al Arabiya in 2011, the company's market value is between 7 and 8 million dollars.
