= Political cartoons in the Middle East =

Political cartoons

== Historical development ==
Political cartoons first set foot in the Middle East in the mid-nineteenth century as the first Ottoman cartoon was published in 1867 in the journal, Istanbul. Following it was the first cartoon in Arab press: Ya'qub Sannu's cartoon published in 1887 in Al-Tankit wa Al-Tabkit (Joking and Censure) newspaper. Until 1925, when Michael Tays launched Kannas al-Shawari (The Road Sweeper), a humorous newspaper in Iraq, most cartoons in the Arab world were printed in Egypt. In 1929, pioneering cartoonist Khalid Kahhala's work emerged as he launched the satirical gazette Al Mudhik al-Mubki (The Weeping Joker) in Syria. Another pioneering cartoonist was Bayram al-Tunisi who started publishing al-Shabab (Youth) in Tunisia in 1932.

== Government control and censorship ==
The political impact of editorial cartoons has led authorities in the Middle East, on countless occasions, to exert control over the content, medium of expression, and scope of these cartoons. For instance, in order to put a stop to unwanted rumors about a military coup in Turkey in July 1997, an Islamist prime minister, Necmettin Erbakan, demanded an inquiry into the activities of ten intellectuals, among whom was the political cartoonist, Salih Memecan. Another instance is the Egyptian government's silencing of political cartoonist Ahmed Hijazi (cartoonist) in order to mitigate the Syrian government's discomfort.

In 1909, a press law that limited the freedom of the press in the Ottoman Empire was passed. Most of the ninety-two humorous gazettes that were launched during the year of Sultan Abdulhamid's dethronement were censored by the Ottoman military government during World War I then by the Allied Powers occupying Constantinople until the end of the Turkish War of Independence. Ottoman cartoonists were creative in trying to evade censorship- for example, some sent erasable drawings that they could amend after receiving approval. Some newspapers published a blank space where the censored cartoon was supposed to be in protest to the censorship.

Censorship persisted to a certain extent during the period of the nation-states succeeding the Ottoman Empire. In Algeria, the government uses an official distribution and circulation monopoly to censor editorial cartoonists, and in Morocco, caricaturing the King or his ministers is punishable by imprisonment. However, political cartoons still played a significant role in political events. For example, the only visible critique of the Israeli occupation during the Intifada period was the political cartoon, which also prevailed during the Islamic Revolution in Iran.

== The Gulf War ==
During the Gulf War, political cartoons were the more independent and reliable alternative to government-controlled Arab television and even Western television in representing the conflict in the Persian Gulf.

In Algeria, the most prominent sources of political cartoons during the Gulf crisis were two weekly cartoon newspapers, the Francophone El-Manchar and the Arabic Es-Sahafa. In 1992, the Algerian government practiced censorship on these newspapers and others by confiscating issues and imposing fines. Algerian political cartoons were unique in that they were largely bilingual, and that served to convey the diametrical opposition of European and Arabic television during the Gulf War. For example, a cartoon published in March 1991 in Sinsar, a weekly newspaper, an Algerian viewer channel-hops between a French-language television program that proclaims the Coalition victory and an Arabic-language Iraqi one that announces Saddam Hussein's supremacy.

In Morocco, many cartoonists used the belly dancer or male homosexual transvestite archetype to stereotype the coalition leadership. President Bush was represented in women's clothing while masculinity was attributed to the American women serving in the armed forces in the Gulf. For example, a cartoon published in March 1991 in Al-Aqrab shows an American female soldier and a Saudi male at her feet, saying: "We thank you, you have sexually excited us, sorry, I mean you have liberated us".

In Tunisia, comic strips were mainly devoted to cultural topics and flourished as such throughout the 1980s until the Gulf War, when some of them adapted to the fast pace of the crisis. Tunis Hébdo, al-Akhbar and al-Shuruq became prominent sources of Gulf crisis cartoons while 'Ali 'Abid remained too polished and elegant to adapt. Examples of such adaptations can be observed in Ta'sila Kurawiyya (Soccer Break or Nap), a comic strip by Tawfiq al-Kuki published in the weekly al-Akhbar and devoted to soccer. This became Ta'sila Khalijiyya (Gulf Break) during the Gulf War. Similarly, the weekly comic strip Hébdrolmadaire (Weekly comics or funnies) published in Tunis Hébdo became Hébdrolmageurre (Weekly war comics or funnies) as it shifted its coverage to the conflict, and the comic strip "Sérieux s'abstenir" of Tunis Hébdo changed its framing to wire, explosives, and the missiles al-Husayn and al-'Abbas.
