= Al'an Fahimtkum =

Al'an Fahimtkum is a Tunisian play.

The play derives its name from the famous phrase of the Tunisian President Zine El-Abidine Ben Ali, when he announced to the Tunisian people in 2011 that he finally understood them (Al’an Fahimtkum), before he was deposed in January 2011. The play was written by the Jordanian satirist and columnist, Ahmad Hasan Al-Zu'bi in 2011. The prominent Jordanian actor, Musa Hijazeen, played the main character in the play, Abu Saqer. He is the head of a Jordanian family of modern means and works as a driver for the government.

== Plot ==
Abu Saqer is a controlling father whose children, in the wake of Arab spring, decide to unite ranks and demand that he give them more freedoms. When their mother joined them, Abu Saqer decided to give concessions, including financial allowances. In the play, Abu Saqer’s brother returns to Jordan after living for 30 years in Canada. Not aware of the Jordanian domestic affairs, he asks his brother, Abu Saqer, to explain to him the situation. Abu Saqer explains how things work in Jordan by satirically alluding to array of controversial issues of interest to all Jordanians, mainly the frequent ministerial re-shuffles (Jordan is famous for the frequent cabinet change), political parties and national unity.

== Political Significance ==
The play addresses several local political issues, mainly privatization and corruption. One of the powerful messages that resonated among Jordanians after the play was the phrase: “They sold it”, this phrase was repeated throughout the play in reference to the wide-scale privatization of the Jordanian public institutions. After Jordanians watched the play on Roya TV, they constantly repeat it whenever the topic of privatization is being discussed.

Al Zu'bi gives a voice to critics of the government who last year took to the streets demanding an end to political corruption and calling for deep reforms. The play can be seen as a result of the movements' in the Arab streets. On that Al-Zoubi said that the play was written by 300 million Arabs.
