= Shihan (newspaper) =

Jordanian weekly newspaper published in Arabic

Shihan (شيحان)
- Native name: شيحان
- Type: Weekly newspaper
- Format: Print, online
- Publisher: Arab Printers Company
- Founded: 1991; 35 years ago
- Language: Arabic
- Headquarters: Amman
- Website: http://www.shihannews.net

Shihan (Arabic: شيحان) was a Jordanian weekly newspaper published in Arabic. The word Shihan is also the name for a mountain located in the southern part of Jordan, close to the city of Al-Karak.

== History and profile ==
Shihan is being published weekly by Arab Printers Company. The paper has ties with the Muslim Brotherhood group in Jordan.

On 2 February 2006 Shihan published the caricatures of Muhammad originally published by the Jyllands-Posten. The reaction of the Jordanian street to this controversial move resulted in the newspaper's editor, Jihad Al Momeny, being fired.

== See also ==
- List of newspapers in Jordan
