= The Jordan Times =

Newspaper in Jordan

- The front page of The Jordan Times on Sunday 31 October 2010
- Type: Daily newspaper
- Format: Broadsheet
- Owner: Jordan Press Foundation
- Publisher: Jordan Press Foundation
- Editor: Raed Omari
- Founded: 1975; 51 years ago
- Language: English
- Headquarters: Amman
- Sister newspapers: Al Ra'i
- OCLC number: 20791953
- Website: www.jordantimes.com

The Jordan Times is an English-language daily newspaper based in Amman, Jordan.

== History ==
Established in 1975, The Jordan Times is owned by the Jordan Press Foundation, a shareholding company which also runs the Arabic-language daily Al Ra'i, the kingdom's best-selling newspaper.

The Jordan Press Foundation has been majority government-owned since its inception, but it is unclear how much the government's stake has fallen since 2000, when a plan to sell some of the Foundation's shares was announced. The Jordan Times maintains editorial independence from its sister daily Al Ra'i.

== Content and profile ==
The newspaper includes two main sections:

- News: Covers local, regional, and world news, and includes subsections on business and sports.
- Opinions: Features opinion commentary and analysis by Jordanian, Arab, and international writers.

The paper's website was the 31st most visited website in the Arab world in 2013.

== Alumni ==
Notable journalists who have worked at The Jordan Times include:

- Rami George Khouri, journalist and commentator on the Middle East. Former editor-in-chief.
- Jill Carroll, Christian Science Monitor reporter kidnapped in Iraq. Former reporter.
- Marwan Muasher, former minister of information. Former editor-in-chief.
- George Hawatmeh, founder of the Arab Media Institute. Former editor-in-chief.
- Ayman Safadi, Jordan's foreign minister. Former deputy prime minister and editor-in-chief.

From the 1980s to 2011 veteran journalist Randa Habib had a weekly column in The Times which was stopped by the paper's management.

== See also ==
- Arab News
- El Watan
