= Al Ra'i (Jordanian newspaper) =

Al Rai (الرأي)
- The front page on 29 October 2010
- Native name: الرأي
- Type: Daily newspaper
- Owner: Jordan Press Foundation
- Founder: Jordan Press Foundation
- Editor-in-chief: Dr. Khalid Shogran
- General manager: Heyam Alkaraki
- Founded: 2 June 1971
- Language: Arabic
- Headquarters: Amman, Jordan
- Sister newspapers: The Jordan Times
- OCLC number: 56565751
- Website: alrai.com

Al Ra'i (Arabic: الرأي; lit. 'The Opinion'), also spelled Alrai, is an Arabic daily newspaper in Jordan. The Jordan Press Foundation, owner of the Al Rai, is government-owned. It has been regarded as Jordan's newspaper of record.

== History ==
After the occupation of the West Bank in June 1967, Jordan needed a media arm to transmit the government's point of view, the only newspaper that was published in Jordan at the time was Ad-Dustour, an independent newspaper from Amman.

On 13 May 1971, the Jordanian Prime Minister Wasfi al-Tal issued law number 26 in 1971 to establish the Jordan Press Foundation which is the publisher. On 2 June 1971, the first issue of Al Rai was published. The daily was the second newspaper to be published by a company owned by the Jordanian government. The first being Al Sharq Al Arabi (صحيفة الشرق العربي), which had its first issue published in 1923. The newspaper is owned and published by Jordan Press Foundation. The company later began to publish an English daily, The Jordan Times.

Al Rai launched its Palestinian edition on 5 October 2005. In August 2008, the daily started its e-journal, Minbar Al Rai, and in May 2009 it launched a weekly newspaper for advertisements.

Its estimated circulation was 45,000 copies in 1985 whereas it was 90,000 copies in 2003. The officials of the paper stated that the daily's circulation was 80,000 in 2010.

== Content and staff ==
The newspaper is composed of five sections:

- Mahalleyyat (Local news)
- Arabs and the World: Section for international news.
- Sports
- Economy
- Literature and Arts

The editors-in-chief of Al Ra'i are appointed by the Jordanian government. The former editors-in-chief of the daily include Abdul Wahab Zaghilat, Samih Maaytah and Mohammad Tal. In late 2011 Majid Asfour was appointed editor-in-chief. Tariq AL-Momani is the current editor-in-chief of the paper.

== See also ==
- List of newspapers in Jordan
