= Ad-Dustour (Jordan) =

Jordanian Arabic daily newspaper

Ad-Dustour (الدستور),
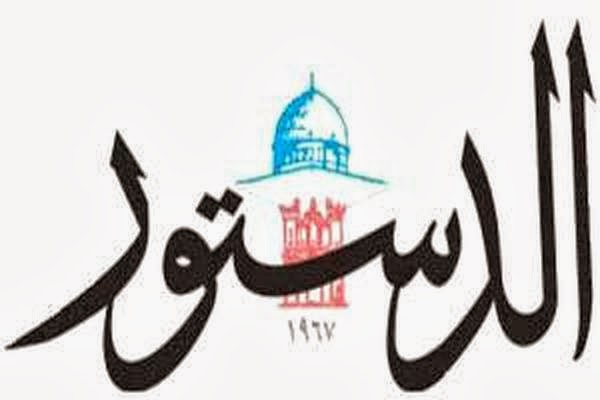
- Native name: الدستور
- Type: Daily newspaper
- Format: Print, online
- Owner(s): Jordan Press and Publishing Company
- Editor: Mustafa Riyalat
- Founded: 28 March 1967; 58 years ago
- Language: Arabic
- Headquarters: Amman, Jordan; 31°59′53.05″N 35°52′47.3″E
- Website: Ad-Dustour website

Ad-Dustour (Arabic: الدستور, 'The Constitution') is an Arabic-language daily newspaper published in Jordan. Its headquarters is in Amman, Jordan.

== History and profile ==
The first issue of Ad-Dustour (in Arabic الدستور) was published on 28 March 1967 as a result of a merger of two publications: Filastin (in Arabic فلسطين) and Al Manar (in Arabic المنار) published in the West Bank that had ceased publication in 1967 because of the Six-Day War.

The daily was a private company until 1986 when the Jordanian government bought a share of it. The daily has nearly 600 staff.

From 1991 to 1995 Musa Keilani served as the editor-in-chief of the paper. Its editor was Nabil Sharif until February 2009. The current editor-in-chief is Mustafa Riyalat.

In 1998, the daily started its website, the first newspaper in the Arab world to do so.

The estimated circulation of Ad-Dustour was 40,000 whereas it was 90,000 copies in 2003.

An Arabic website, Industry Arabic, named Ad Dustour as the most influential Arabic newspaper in 2020.

== Contents ==
The daily contains four or five sections:

- First Section: for headline and domestic news.
- Second Section: for international news, business and economy.
- Addustour Alriyadi: for international and domestic sport news.
- Doroob: for miscellaneous news related to health and living styles.
- The Cultural Section: This section appears every Friday and contains domestic, regional, and international cultural events.
- Al-Shabab: This section is published every Wednesday, and daily during major sport competitions such as FIFA World Cup. It covers weekly domestic, and international youth events.

== See also ==
- List of newspapers in Jordan
