= Next Jordanian general election =

- by September 2028
Incumbent Prime Minister
Jafar Hassan
Independent

General elections are scheduled to be held in Jordan by September 2028 to elect members of the House of Representatives, the lower house of Parliament.

== Electoral system ==
The previous 2024 elections were the first to be held after a series of constitutional amendments and new electoral and political party laws that enabled new changes, recommended by the Royal Committee to Modernize the Political System. These new changes include lowering the candidacy age from 30 to 25 and allowing for a mixed electoral system. The new proportional representation system allows two votes for each person, one vote for open lists running in 18 local districts, and another closed list for political parties for the national district. Out of the 138 seats of the House, 97 are for representatives from local districts and 41 for representatives from the national district, with 12 quotas for the Christian, Circassian, and Chechen minorities, as well as 18 seats for the women's quota. Despite the quotas, these groups can also compete in non-quota seats. In upcoming elections, the percentage of seats for the national district is expected to increase until parliamentary majorities allow for the formation of parliamentary governments.
