= 2024 Jordanian general election =

- 10 September 2024
- All 138 seats in the House of Representatives; 70 seats needed for a majority
- Turnout: 32.25%
Party	Leader	Seats
Islamic Action Front	Murad Adaileh	31
National Charter Party	Muhammad Momani	21
Eradah Party	Nidal Batayneh	19
Progress Party	Khaled Bkar	8
National Islamic Party	Mustafa Amawi	7
National Union Movement	Muhammad Shaheen	5
Azem Party	Zaid Naffa	5
Blessed Land Party	Mashhour Zreiqat	2
Labour Party	Rula Farra	2
Namaa–Labour	Mohammad Rawashdeh	2
Civil Democratic Party	Adnan Sawa'ir	1
Youth Party		1
Local lists	–	34
This lists parties that won seats. See the complete results below.
Prime Minister before	Prime Minister after
Bisher Khasawneh; Independent	Jafar Hassan; Independent

General elections were held in Jordan on 10 September 2024 to elect the 20th House of Representatives, the lower house of the Parliament.

== Background ==
On 25 July 2024, King Abdullah II of Jordan issued a royal decree to dissolve the House of Representatives. This dissolution preceded parliamentary elections set for September 10. The previous House of Representatives had been elected in November 2020.

These elections follow reforms that lowered the candidacy age from 30 to 25, and allow for a mixed proportional representation system for 138 seats. The new system allows two votes for each person, one vote for lists running in 18 local districts competing for 97 seats, and another for political parties for the national district for 41 seats, with 12 quotas for the Christian, Circassian, and Chechen minorities, as well as 18 seats for women. In upcoming elections, the percentage of seats for the national district is expected to increase until parliamentary majorities allow for formation of parliamentary governments.

On 13 June, the Islamic Action Front, the largest opposition party in Jordan, sent a letter to Prime Minister Bisher Khasawneh, complaining of “electoral harassment” practiced against potential candidates and supporters by the kingdom’s security services.

Starting on 16 August, fake election posters went viral showing The Boys actor Antony Starr as Homelander, photo-shopped to look like a politician being plastered across the country to satirize candidate Khaled Musa Issa Abu Hassan's strategy of putting up an unseemly amount of posters to cover up most public spaces.

Just two days before the election, a Jordanian truck driver killed three Israeli guards at the country's border crossing with the West Bank, in the first such attack since the 1990s.

== Electoral system ==
The elections were the first to be held after a series of constitutional amendments and a new electoral and political parties laws that enabled new changes, recommended by the Royal Committee to Modernize the Political System. These new changes include lowering the candidacy age from 30 to 25, and allows for a mixed electoral system. The new proportional representation system allows two votes for each person, one vote for open lists running in 18 local districts, and another closed list for political parties for the national district. Out of the 138 seats of the House, 97 are for representatives from local district, and 41 for representatives from the national district, with 12 quotas for the Christian, Circassian, and Chechen minorities, as well as 18 seats for women's quota. Despite the quotas, these groups can also compete in non-quota seats. In upcoming elections, the percentage of seats for the national district is expected to increase until parliamentary majorities allow for formation of parliamentary governments.

== Campaign ==
937 candidates on 172 lists ran for the 97 seats of the 18 local electoral districts, while 686 candidates on 25 lists belonging to 36 parties ran for the 41 seats of the national district. There were a total of 5,080,858 registered voters.

Polling opened at 07:00 and closed at 19:00.

== Results ==
Party	Seats		
Party	National district	Local districts	Total
Islamic Action Front	17	14	31
National Charter Party	4	17	21
Eradah Party	3	16	19
Progress Party	3	5	8
National Islamic Party	3	4	7
National Union Movement	3	2	5
Azem Party	2	3	5
Blessed Land Party	2	0	2
Namaa–Labour Alliance	2	0	2
Labour Party	2	0	2
Jordanian Civil Democratic Party	0	1	1
Youth Party	0	1	1
Local lists	0	34	34
Total	41	97	138
Source: EEAS

=== National district ===
Results by Electoral District (National List) Islamic Action Front 10–20% 20–30% 30–40% 40–50% 50–60% Jordanian Communist Party 20–30%

Party	Votes	%	Seats			
Party	Votes	%	General	Circassian/ Chechen	Christian	Total
Islamic Action Front	464,350	33.69	17	0	0	17
National Charter Party	93,680	6.80	3	1	0	4
National Islamic Party	87,519	6.35	3	0	0	3
Eradah Party	75,121	5.45	3	0	0	3
National Union Movement	66,227	4.81	2	0	1	3
Progress Party (Jordan)	61,199	4.44	2	0	1	3
Blessed Land Party	50,244	3.65	2	0	0	2
Jordanian Labor Party	50,142	3.64	2	0	0	2
Namaa-Labor Alliance	45,859	3.33	2	0	0	2
Azem Party	41,891	3.04	2	0	0	2
Jordanian Communist Party	38,633	2.80	0	0	0	0
Building & Labour Coalition	37,068	2.69	0	0	0	0
National Loyalty	34,076	2.47	0	0	0	0
National Development Party	27,909	2.03	0	0	0	0
Jordanian Future and Life Party	26,091	1.89	0	0	0	0
National Construction	26,090	1.89	0	0	0	0
Vision Party	26,000	1.89	0	0	0	0
Democratic Current Alliance	23,551	1.71	0	0	0	0
Justice and Reform Party	20,023	1.45	0	0	0	0
Jordanian National Democratic Alliance	17,939	1.30	0	0	0	0
New Approach List	17,622	1.28	0	0	0	0
Unionist and National Constitutional Alliance	14,239	1.03	0	0	0	0
Rise List Alliance	12,354	0.90	0	0	0	0
Jordanian Shura Council	11,968	0.87	0	0	0	0
Ennahda and Democratic Workers Party	8,330	0.60	0	0	0	0
Total	1,378,125	100.00	38	1	2	41
Valid votes	1,378,125	84.12				
Invalid/blank votes	260,231	15.88				
Total votes	1,638,356	100.00				
Registered voters/turnout	5,080,858	32.25				
Source: Independent Election Commission

=== Local districts ===
Results by district
District	Registered	List	Votes	Seats			
District	Registered	List	Votes	General	Circassian/ Chechen	Christian	Women
Ajloun	114,300	People of Resolve	15,307	1		1	1
Ajloun	114,300	Sons of Ajloun Mountains	12,574	1			
Ajloun	114,300	Union	9,873				
Ajloun	114,300	Khait Al-Laban Ajloun	9,175				
Ajloun	114,300	Loyalty	8,260				
Ajloun	114,300	Right	2,840				
Ajloun	114,300	Agreement	73				
Ajloun	114,300	Invalid	3,846				
Amman 1	617,759	Islamic Action Front	22,133	1			1
Amman 1	617,759	Amman	17,346	1			
Amman 1	617,759	The Covenant	17,310	1			
Amman 1	617,759	Al-Aqsa Mosque	16,180	1			
Amman 1	617,759	To Inspire	14,202	1			
Amman 1	617,759	Union	8,916				
Amman 1	617,759	The Future	7,381				
Amman 1	617,759	Right	5,215				
Amman 1	617,759	Determination	5,132				
Amman 1	617,759	Renewal	1,474				
Amman 1	617,759	Invalid	5,230				
Amman 2	852,487	Islamic Action Front	38,361	2		1	1
Amman 2	852,487	Growth	31,998	1			
Amman 2	852,487	Union	20,745	1			
Amman 2	852,487	The Brave Ones	18,837	1			
Amman 2	852,487	Right	15,528	1			
Amman 2	852,487	Elite	12,789				
Amman 2	852,487	Dignity	6,500				
Amman 2	852,487	Unity (Wihda)	2,263				
Amman 2	852,487	Growth and Work Alliance	1,623				
Amman 2	852,487	Invalid	7,309				
Amman 3	484,055	The Future	26,489	1			
Amman 3	484,055	Islamic Action Front	22,486	1	1		1
Amman 3	484,055	Packages	9,418	1			
Amman 3	484,055	The Brave Ones	9,395	1			
Amman 3	484,055	Union	8,071				
Amman 3	484,055	Accord	6,777				
Amman 3	484,055	Change	6,643				
Amman 3	484,055	The Banner	3,425				
Amman 3	484,055	Accomplishment	3,405				
Amman 3	484,055	Amman People	1,691				
Amman 3	484,055	Gaza Hashem	1,214				
Amman 3	484,055	Message	452				
Amman 3	484,055	Palm Tree	51				
Amman 3	484,055	Invalid	5,906				
Aqaba	80,760	Islamic Action Front	8,236	1			1
Aqaba	80,760	Covenant	8,229	1			
Aqaba	80,760	Homeland	5,583				
Aqaba	80,760	Jordan Gap	4,485				
Aqaba	80,760	Aqaba	2,194				
Aqaba	80,760	Accord	657				
Aqaba	80,760	Sincerity	417				
Aqaba	80,760	Youth of the Country	65				
Aqaba	80,760	Invalid	879				
Balqa	352,948	Covenant	24,566	1			
Balqa	352,948	Justice	24,357	1		1	1
Balqa	352,948	Blessing	18,483	1			
Balqa	352,948	Loyalty	17,460	1			
Balqa	352,948	List of Goodness	14,994	1			
Balqa	352,948	Sons of Balqa	12,966	1			
Balqa	352,948	Islamic Action Front	10,416				
Balqa	352,948	Change	7,729				
Balqa	352,948	The Sons of the General	3,613				
Balqa	352,948	Peace	2,026				
Balqa	352,948	Nashmiyat Balqa	819				
Balqa	352,948	Invalid	6,410				
Irbid 1	569,974	Justice	22,387	1			1
Irbid 1	569,974	The Audience	21,213	1			
Irbid 1	569,974	Islamic Action Front	19,048	1			
Irbid 1	569,974	The Covenant	18,645	1			
Irbid 1	569,974	The Future	16,972	1			
Irbid 1	569,974	Cooperation	16,147	1			
Irbid 1	569,974	Dignity	14,520	1			
Irbid 1	569,974	Loyalty	13,935				
Irbid 1	569,974	Homeland	11,635				
Irbid 1	569,974	The Brave Ones	11,448				
Irbid 1	569,974	The Poor	10,546				
Irbid 1	569,974	Accord	9,664				
Irbid 1	569,974	Invalid	10,854				
Irbid 2	324,321	Knights	20,347	1			1
Irbid 2	324,321	The People	19,168	1			
Irbid 2	324,321	The Covenant	18,709	1		1	
Irbid 2	324,321	Justice	16,786	1			
Irbid 2	324,321	Loyalty	14,745	1			
Irbid 2	324,321	Progress	14,270				
Irbid 2	324,321	Change	10,444				
Irbid 2	324,321	The Brave Ones	10,090				
Irbid 2	324,321	Youth	4,005				
Irbid 2	324,321	Hope List	1,027				
Irbid 2	324,321	Gate of ar-Rayyan	972				
Irbid 2	324,321	Invalid	8,355				
Jerash	129,236	People of Determination	12,425	1			
Jerash	129,236	Jerash	11,372	1			
Jerash	129,236	The Country Deserves It	11,035	1			1
Jerash	129,236	Jerash Will	7,580				
Jerash	129,236	Loyalty	6,935				
Jerash	129,236	The Brave Ones	6,864				
Jerash	129,236	Islamic Action Front	5,369				
Jerash	129,236	Renaissance	3,825				
Jerash	129,236	Message	2,580				
Jerash	129,236	Invalid	3,401				
Karak	189,268	The Light	16,785	1			
Karak	189,268	Loyalty	16,050	1		1	1
Karak	189,268	Message	13,750	1			
Karak	189,268	Good	13,365	1			
Karak	189,268	Right Bloc	8,955	1			
Karak	189,268	Karak	8,266	1			
Karak	189,268	Victory	7,907				
Karak	189,268	Islamic Action Front	7,449				
Karak	189,268	Dawn of the Jordan Valley	5,272				
Karak	189,268	Palm Block	4,572				
Karak	189,268	Al-Mizan	2,934				
Karak	189,268	The Coffee Pot	2,380				
Karak	189,268	Justice	2,261				
Karak	189,268	The Job	1,946				
Karak	189,268	Science and Knowledge	110				
Karak	189,268	Dignity	87				
Karak	189,268	The Shemagh	31				
Karak	189,268	Invalid	4,717				
Ma'an	57,414	Union	6,263	1			1
Ma'an	57,414	Right	6,018	1			
Ma'an	57,414	Accord	5,999	1			
Ma'an	57,414	Covenant	5,920				
Ma'an	57,414	Al-Shoubak	4,715				
Ma'an	57,414	Panic	4,071				
Ma'an	57,414	Invalid	1,589				
Madaba	126,381	Madaba	10,080	1			
Madaba	126,381	Loyalty	9,271	1		1	1
Madaba	126,381	Covenant	7,546				
Madaba	126,381	Thiban	6,693				
Madaba	126,381	Dignity	5,841				
Madaba	126,381	National Unity	5,501				
Madaba	126,381	Islamic Action Front	5,240				
Madaba	126,381	Determination	4,625				
Madaba	126,381	Jerusalem	1,011				
Madaba	126,381	Al-Mizan	381				
Madaba	126,381	Invalid	3,775				
Mafraq	110,932	Right Block	17,465	1			1
Mafraq	110,932	Knights of Mafraq	11,399	1			
Mafraq	110,932	Mafraq Brings Us Together	11,262	1			
Mafraq	110,932	The Flag	10,817				
Mafraq	110,932	Wisdom	3,820				
Mafraq	110,932	Sons of Ploughmen	105				
Mafraq	110,932	Invalid	2,940				
Tafilah	61,996	We are Proud of the country	5,124	1			1
Tafilah	61,996	Rain	4,387	1			
Tafilah	61,996	The Proud Tafilah	3,799	1			
Tafilah	61,996	Dawn	3,456				
Tafilah	61,996	Union	3,367				
Tafilah	61,996	Dignity	3,280				
Tafilah	61,996	The Banner	2,922				
Tafilah	61,996	The Promise	2,790				
Tafilah	61,996	Free Sound	2,122				
Tafilah	61,996	Certainty	481				
Tafilah	61,996	The Determination	89				
Tafilah	61,996	Invalid	2,128				
Zarqa	727,569	Dignity	41,335	2		1	1
Zarqa	727,569	Islamic Action Front	20,169	1	1		
Zarqa	727,569	Determination	17,357	1			
Zarqa	727,569	Agreement	15,204	1			
Zarqa	727,569	Progress	14,142	1			
Zarqa	727,569	National Islamic Party	13,206	1			
Zarqa	727,569	Union	12,195				
Zarqa	727,569	Sons of the Country	11,071				
Zarqa	727,569	Sons of Zarqa	3,675				
Zarqa	727,569	Workers	1,612				
Zarqa	727,569	National Loyalty	276				
Zarqa	727,569	Invalid	7,205				
Bedouins of the North	119,184	The Candle	12,599	1			
Bedouins of the North	119,184	Thunder of the North	12,545	1			1
Bedouins of the North	119,184	Chivalry	11,035				
Bedouins of the North	119,184	Loyalty and Covenant	8,722				
Bedouins of the North	119,184	Accord	7,768				
Bedouins of the North	119,184	Dignity	3,065				
Bedouins of the North	119,184	Badia Union	2,223				
Bedouins of the North	119,184	Invalid	2,376				
Bedouins of the Middle	76,322	Blessing	6,669	1			
Bedouins of the Middle	76,322	Determination	6,559	1			1
Bedouins of the Middle	76,322	Accord	6,097				
Bedouins of the Middle	76,322	Dignity	6,073				
Bedouins of the Middle	76,322	Honesty	4,037				
Bedouins of the Middle	76,322	The Future	3,456				
Bedouins of the Middle	76,322	Renaissance	2,463				
Bedouins of the Middle	76,322	One Body	1,385				
Bedouins of the Middle	76,322	Justice	520				
Bedouins of the Middle	76,322	Invalid	1,546				
Bedouins of the South	85,952	The Brave Ones	15,788	1			1
Bedouins of the South	85,952	National Charter Party	13,414	1			
Bedouins of the South	85,952	Loyalty	11,885				
Bedouins of the South	85,952	The Future	9,879				
Bedouins of the South	85,952	List of Goodness	951				
Bedouins of the South	85,952	Invalid	980				

== Aftermath ==
The Islamic Action Front saw significant gains, winning 31 seats; however, this was not enough to win a majority outright. This was the strongest showing for Islamist parties in parliamentary elections since 1989. Etaf Roudan, a Jordanian journalist, stated that the IAF's political position on the Palestinian issue had pushed leftists, traditional nationalists, and tribal forces to vote for the Islamic party.

This stance was reflected by Murad al-Adaileh, general secretary of the IAF, who said that the election results showed "The next House of Representatives must be robust in confronting the extreme Israeli right, which may, in the future, align with the extreme American right if Trump wins the US elections." France 24 reported that the "nearly half a million votes" the IAF won was "unprecedented in their history in Jordan." Adaileh also claimed that the election results were a "popular referendum" for Jordan to scrap the Israel–Jordan peace treaty, and to back Hamas.

On 15 September, Bisher Khasawneh resigned as prime minister. In response, King Abdullah nominated his chief of staff, Jafar Hassan, to form a new government.
