= 2013 Jordanian general election =

| ← 2010 | 23 January 2013 | 2016 → |

150 to the House of Representatives
- Turnout: 56.6%

Early general elections were held in Jordan on 23 January 2013. Voter turnout was reported to be 56.6%.

== Electoral system ==
Prior to the elections a new electoral law was passed, allowing voters to cast two ballots; one for a candidate in their constituency and one for party lists elected by proportional representation at the national level. In addition, the number of seats reserved for candidates of political parties was raised from 17 to 27 out of the 150 seats in the House of Representatives. Fifteen seats were reserved for women, whilst the remaining 108 seats were elected in 45 single and multi-member constituencies. A new Independent Election Commission was also created.

Around 70% of eligible voters were reported to have registered to vote. Although over two-thirds of the population lived in urban areas at the time of the election, cities were allocated less than one-third of seats in the House of Representatives.

== Campaign ==
In July 2012, the Muslim Brotherhood-affiliated Islamic Action Front announced that the party would boycott the elections, stating that the changes to the electoral law increasing the number of seats for political parties did not go far enough and that the constituency system favoured tribal candidates. Opposition parties had demanded that 50% of seats be reserved for parties rather than the 18% provided for.

A total of 1,400 candidates registered to contest the elections, of which 22 were described as Islamists.

== Conduct ==
The Islamist opposition complained that the elections had been marred by fraud, claiming that turnout had been artificially inflated during the last two hours of voting. The voting period had been extended by an hour to 20:00.

The National Democratic Institute for International Affairs (NDI) reported that there had been a "marked improvement in procedures and administration", but also noted shortcomings and irregularities. The NDI also criticised unequal constituency sizes, claiming that they increased tribal cleavages.

== Results ==
| Party | Proportional representation | | | Constituency | | | Total seats |
| Party | Votes | % | Seats | Votes | % | Seats | Total seats |
|---|---|---|---|---|---|---|---|
| Islamic Centre Party | 114,458 | 9.74 | 3 | | | | 3 |
| Stronger Jordan | 100,159 | 8.52 | 2 | | | | 2 |
| The Homeland | 94,982 | 8.08 | 2 | | | | 2 |
| National Union Party | 68,149 | 5.80 | 2 | | | | 2 |
| National Current Party | 48,970 | 4.17 | 1 | | | | 1 |
| Salvation | 37,208 | 3.17 | 1 | | | | 1 |
| Labour and Professionalism | 36,555 | 3.11 | 1 | | | | 1 |
| Cooperation | 35,565 | 3.03 | 1 | | | | 1 |
| Dignity | 33,858 | 2.88 | 1 | | | | 1 |
| Unified Front | 32,840 | 2.79 | 1 | | | | 1 |
| National Unity | 31,477 | 2.68 | 1 | | | | 1 |
| Construction | 30,938 | 2.63 | 1 | | | | 1 |
| The People | 28,894 | 2.46 | 1 | | | | 1 |
| People of Determination | 24,115 | 2.05 | 1 | | | | 1 |
| Free Voice | 23,222 | 1.98 | 1 | | | | 1 |
| Voice of the Nation | 20,290 | 1.73 | 1 | | | | 1 |
| National Labour | 19,806 | 1.69 | 1 | | | | 1 |
| al-Quds | 17,834 | 1.52 | 1 | | | | 1 |
| al-Bayareq | 16,604 | 1.41 | 1 | | | | 1 |
| The Dawn | 16,313 | 1.39 | 1 | | | | 1 |
| Shabab al-Wifaq | 14,620 | 1.24 | 1 | | | | 1 |
| Citizenship | 14,012 | 1.19 | 1 | | | | 1 |
| Democratic Advancement | 13,917 | 1.18 | 0 | | | | 0 |
| Change | 13,901 | 1.18 | 0 | | | | 0 |
| Honor of the Nation | 11,887 | 1.01 | 0 | | | | 0 |
| Unity | 11,359 | 0.97 | 0 | | | | 0 |
| People of Piety | 11,177 | 0.95 | 0 | | | | 0 |
| Al-Aqsa | 10,974 | 0.93 | 0 | | | | 0 |
| National Righteousness | 10,850 | 0.92 | 0 | | | | 0 |
| Al-'Adl | 10,815 | 0.92 | 0 | | | | 0 |
| National Reform | 10,799 | 0.92 | 0 | | | | 0 |
| Free Statement | 10,562 | 0.90 | 0 | | | | 0 |
| Justice and Reform | 10,400 | 0.88 | 0 | | | | 0 |
| We are Proud of the Country | 10,332 | 0.88 | 0 | | | | 0 |
| Good People | 10,125 | 0.86 | 0 | | | | 0 |
| Justice and Freedom | 9,434 | 0.80 | 0 | | | | 0 |
| Scared Homeland | 9,066 | 0.77 | 0 | | | | 0 |
| The Poor Turn to God | 8,969 | 0.76 | 0 | | | | 0 |
| The Future is Now | 8,854 | 0.75 | 0 | | | | 0 |
| Right Banner | 8,847 | 0.75 | 0 | | | | 0 |
| The Sincere Promise Block | 8,708 | 0.74 | 0 | | | | 0 |
| Sons of the Country | 8,701 | 0.74 | 0 | | | | 0 |
| Sons of the Ploughmen | 8,474 | 0.72 | 0 | | | | 0 |
| Work and Workers | 8,083 | 0.69 | 0 | | | | 0 |
| Disbality Coalition | 7,941 | 0.68 | 0 | | | | 0 |
| Citizen | 6,980 | 0.59 | 0 | | | | 0 |
| Crescent | 6,918 | 0.59 | 0 | | | | 0 |
| Jordanian Doaa Party | 6,793 | 0.58 | 0 | | | | 0 |
| Justice and Development | 6,734 | 0.57 | 0 | | | | 0 |
| Justice and Equality | 6,579 | 0.56 | 0 | | | | 0 |
| Call of the Homeland | 6,302 | 0.54 | 0 | | | | 0 |
| Loyalty | 5,952 | 0.51 | 0 | | | | 0 |
| The Light | 5,501 | 0.47 | 0 | | | | 0 |
| Renewal | 4,913 | 0.42 | 0 | | | | 0 |
| Welfare/People of Determination | 4,781 | 0.41 | 0 | | | | 0 |
| Sons of God | 4,100 | 0.35 | 0 | | | | 0 |
| Right | 3,292 | 0.28 | 0 | | | | 0 |
| Al-'Adālah | 3,224 | 0.27 | 0 | | | | 0 |
| The Future | 3,098 | 0.26 | 0 | | | | 0 |
| National Authorities | 2,908 | 0.25 | 0 | | | | 0 |
| Professional Sectors | 2,039 | 0.17 | 0 | | | | 0 |
| Independents | | | | 1,243,591 | 100.00 | 123 | 123 |
| Total | 1,175,158 | 100.00 | 27 | 1,243,591 | 100.00 | 123 | 150 |
| Valid votes | 1,175,158 | 91.24 | | | | | |
| Invalid/blank votes | 112,885 | 8.76 | | | | | |
| Total votes | 1,288,043 | 100.00 | | | | | |
| Registered voters/turnout | 2,272,182 | 56.69 | | | | | |
Source: Official Gazette, IRI, Jordan Times

== Aftermath ==
Following the elections Interim Prime Minister Abdullah Ensour was appointed to the post on a permanent basis, with King Abdullah consulting Parliament on membership of the cabinet for the first time. With 19 members, the new cabinet was the smallest in four decades.
