= Dima Tahboub =

Jordanian writer and politician (born 1976)

- ديمة طهبوب
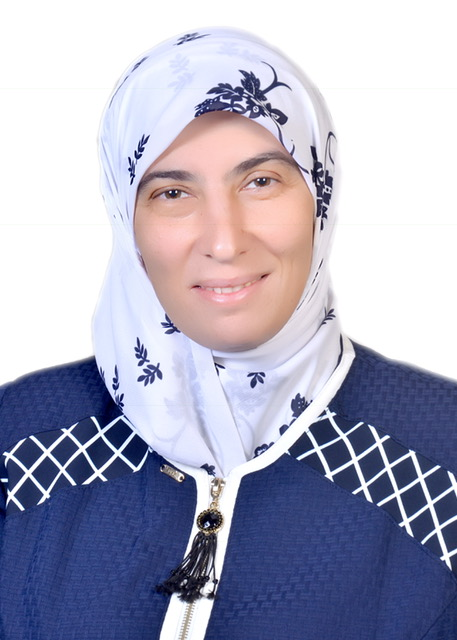
- Born: 1976 (age 49–50); Hebron
- Education: Ph.D
- Alma mater: University of Jordan; University of Manchester
- Occupations: Writer, political analyst, member of Jordan's Muslim Brotherhood, and media spokesperson of the Jordanian Islamic Action Front
- Spouse: Tareq Ayyoub
- Writing career
- Language: English
- Subject: Palestine

Dima Tahboub (Arabic:ديمة طهبوب; born 1976, Hebron) is a Jordanian writer, political analyst, member of Jordan's Muslim Brotherhood, and media spokesperson of the Jordanian Islamic Action Front in English.

She won a seat in the 2016 Jordanian general election and is currently serving as a Representative.

== Background and education ==
She was born in 1976; her father Tarek Tahboub is the former head of Jordan's Medical Association. In 2000 she married Tareq Ayyoub, and in 2002 the couple had a daughter, Fatima. Tareq, a reporter, died in an American missile attack that hit the Al Jazeera building in Baghdad in 2003.

She has received a Ph.D. from the University of Manchester in England and a Bachelor's degree in English from the University of Jordan.

In March 2020 she offered live English lessons on her public Facebook page, given the temporary shutdown of schools resulting from the COVID outbreak.

== Writing ==
She began publishing regularly with the Assabeel newspaper in Jordan, and has written more than 800 articles. Next she published in Al-Quds Al-Arabi and Islamtoday and Al-Jazeera Talk, and in Palestinian newspapers and many other media websites.

She writes about Palestine as an essential part of her articles.

== Controversies ==
In 2017, Tahboub lobbied for the banning of a Lebanese band, Mashrou' Leila, from performing in Amman due to their calls for sexual freedoms. She also issued a complaint against the only online LGBTQ+ magazine in Jordan, My Kali, and managed to push the Jordanian government to censor it. Tahboub also queried the Minister of Justice in 2017 if the Jordanian government tolerated homosexuality in the country.

In a July 2017 interview on Deutsche Welle’s conflict zone, Tahboub praised a Jordanian soldier who was responsible for the 1997 Island of Peace massacre in which the soldier opened fire at a large group of Israeli schoolgirls, killing seven of them and injuring six others. The interviewer asked Tahboub, "You’re a mother. And you’re quite happy to have 13 and 14 year old girls, just because they are Israelis, killed? Unprotected children, killed?", to which she replied: "Because they are enemies, they are enemies." She also stated that "they mocked the Jordanian people, they mocked our religion", referring to the claims made by Daqamseh that the children had mocked him while praying. However, a military tribunal in 1997 had diagnosed Daqamseh of mental disease, and he was sentenced for 20 years with hard labor.

In October 2017, Tahboub sued a secular Jordanian activist for defamation after he published an image of a person riding a horse carrying a sword in front of an ISIL flag. The activist placed Tahboub's face on that person's face, attempting to criticize her for supporting an incident in which a police officer, acting without orders, harassed students in a restaurant that was open for eating before sunset during the month of Ramadan. The activist was arrested and was only released after his family asked Tahboub for clemency.

In November 2018, a conference by a faith research center in Jordan was banned because it had a workshop on "People's History of God’s Birth". The conference faced a backlash by some who considered it to be an attack and insult on Islam. The incitement was reportedly started by Tahboub after she intervened in support of banning the conference. Tahboub again filed a defamation lawsuit against a number of Jordanian activists criticizing her.
