= 2007 Jordanian general election =

- 20 November 2007

150 to the House of Representatives

General elections were held in Jordan on 20 November 2007. Following the election, Prime Minister Marouf al-Bakhit and his cabinet resigned, as it normally followed in the Jordanian political system. King Abdullah II appointed Nader al-Dahabi as the new prime minister on 22 November to lead a new technocratic government.

== Electoral system ==
The House of Representatives had 110 seats elected in 45 regional electoral districts, three seats elected in closed tribal districts and one national woman quota district. A minimum of six seats were guaranteed for women, nine for Christians, and three for the Circassian and Chechen minorities.

== Campaign ==
885 candidates contested the elections, including 199 women, the highest participation of female candidacy the country had seen. Traditionally elections have been fought by individuals standing as independents or under tribal support and not as partisans. Some of the candidates in this election have political affiliations, and some belong to political parties.

Most of the Islamic candidates contested under the Islamic Action Front (IAF) banner, with the party fielding 22 candidates. Only 6 of those 22 representing the IAF candidates won the elections, which is viewed as a major setback to the influence of the IAF inside Jordan.

== Conduct ==
The IAF, who won 17 parliamentary seats in the previous elections in 2003, has demanded independent monitors. Marouf al-Bakhit, the prime minister, turned down the request which he said would mean "that Jordan's transparency and electoral process is questionable". As reports of "vote buying" spread, a local newspaper published a picture showing a voter allegedly receiving a sum of money from the aide of a candidate.

== Results ==
Overall turnout was 54%, though it varied between 80% in rural areas and 28% in some constituencies in the capital.

| Party | Votes | % | Seats |
|---|---|---|---|
| Islamic Action Front | | | 6 |
| Independents | | | 98 |
| Reserved seats for women | | | 6 |
| Total | | | 110 |
| Total votes | 1,326,070 | – | |
| Registered voters/turnout | 2,455,686 | 54.00 | |
Source: Official Gazette, IFES, IPU, IDEA
