= National Union Movement =

National Union Movement may refer to:

- National Union Movement (Chile), Chilean political party (1983–1987)
- National Union Movement (Jordan), Jordanian political party (2024–present)
