= Ibrahim Zeid Keilani =

Jordanian muslim cleric and politician (1937–2013)

Sheikh Ibrahim Zeid Keilani

Member of the House of Representatives
- In office 1993–1997

Minister of Awqaf and Islamic Affairs
- In office 1990 or January 1991 – ?
- Prime Minister: Mudar Badran

Personal details
- Born: 1937 As-Salt, Transjordan
- Died: 2 April 2013 (aged 75–76)
- Party: Islamic Action Front
- Other political affiliations: Muslim Brotherhood
- Education: University of Baghdad; Damascus University; Al-Azhar University

Sheikh Ibrahim Zeid Keilani (1937 – 2 April 2013) was a Jordanian Muslim cleric and politician. He served as the minister of awqaf and Islamic affairs in 1990 and served as a member of Jordan's House of Representatives between 1993 and 1997. He was a member of the Islamic Action Front, the political wing of Jordan's Muslim Brotherhood, and served on the party's Sharia Ulema Committee. He was described as an Islamist.

== Early life ==
Keilani was born in As-Salt in 1937. Keilani studied Islamic Studies at the University of Baghdad and Damascus University. He then earned his MA and Ph.D. at Al-Azhar University in Cairo, Egypt.

== Career and religious views ==
During the 1970s Keilani hosted a television show, the show was important in creating support for the first Islamic bank of the country. The main proposer of the Jordan Islamic Bank, Sami Hamoud, featured on four episodes to discuss Islamic banking. Keilani later served on the Fatwa Committee of the Preparatory Committee of the bank.

Keilani was appointed as Minister of Awqaf and Islamic Affairs either in 1990 or January 1991. During the Gulf War, while he was the minister, Keilani supported Saddam Hussein. He condemned the United States and the Arab states that fought against Iraq in the war, saying that they were treacherous for fighting against the "army of Iraq, which is the army of Islam". At the same time he also supported the Palestinian cause, saying that Jerusalem belonged to the Palestinians.

After his term of minister, Keilani served in the House of Representatives of 12th Parliament of Jordan, which was in place from 1993 to 1997. In the parliamentary year 1996–1997 he served as chair of the law committee.

=== Islamic Action Front ===
In 2000, the Jordanian government tried to introduce Saturday as a second rest-day of the week. Keilani, as leader of the Islamic Action Front's Sharia Ulema Committee opposed this. Keilani said that Saturday was the day off of Jordan's enemy, Israel, and that by implementing the measure the Jordanian government would be acting treacherously. As leader of the committee Keilani defended the practice of honor killings. During the celebration of the Jordanian Independence Day on 25 May 2001 the Jordanian Muslim Brotherhood boycotted the official celebrations for the first time. Instead, they launched protests in which they voiced their support for Palestine and protest against Jordanian ties with Israel. Keilani was one of the main speakers during the protests.

In 2004 members and leadership of the Jordanian Muslim Brotherhood were involved in leading sermons and teaching in mosques while having no authorization to do so by the Ministry of Awqaf and Islamic Affairs. Several members of the Muslim Brotherhood were arrested, while others were summoned to talk to security officials. Keilani together with fellow member of parliament Ahmad al-Koufahi was involved in a row with security personnel and was later admitted to hospiptal.

Jordan had implemented the Convention on the Elimination of All Forms of Discrimination against Women in 2007. Keilani criticized the government for doing so, saying that the treaty was "a dangerous agreement that effects the rights of citizens as well as the nation's identity and values". He accused the treaty as an effort to distance people from religion and as an effort to destroy the Muslim family.

In 2008, Keilani disagreed with top Saudi Islamic cleric, Saleh al-Lihedan, who issued a fatwa making it permissible to kill owners and employees of television stations which showed immoral content. Although Keilani agreed with al-Lihedan that some of the content was immoral to Islamic standards, he feared that the fatwa would bring unrest to countries. He said that governments were responsible for dealing with the television channels.

In 2010 Keilani ordered a ban on the increasing tourism to Jerusalem, a holy city for Muslims. He said that the religious tourism normalized relations between Arab states and Israel.

== Death ==
Keilani died on 2 April 2013, aged 76.
