= National Charter Party =

National Charter Party حزب الميثاق الوطني
- Secretary-General: Muhammad Al-Momani
- Founded: 2022
- Merger of: National Loyalty Party; National Aid Party; Charter Party
- Headquarters: Amman
- Ideology: Civic nationalism Monarchism; Anti-corruption; Welfarism
- Political position: Centre
- Colours: Gold
- House of Representatives: 21 / 138

Website
- mithaqparty.jo

The National Charter Party (Arabic: حزب الميثاق الوطني) is a political party in Jordan. Following the 2024 general election the party became the second largest in the House of Representatives.

== History ==
Founded in 2022 following constitutional reforms, National Charter was composed of previously serving parliamentarians viewed as loyalists to the existing government. National Charter is a result of a merger between the Wafa, Awn and Mithaq parties.

== Ideology ==
=== Economic ===
The National Charter Party is moderate. It advocates largely for a social market economy, with its platform's economic policies largely focused on investments in both the public and private sectors, alongside expanding trade with neighboring countries. Along with this, it advocates for combating corruption.

=== Social ===
The National Charter Party advocates for expanding women's rights, alongside cooperation between Muslims and Christians.

=== Foreign policy ===
The party advocates for Palestinian statehood, however, it is unclear whether the party supports a two-state or a one-state solution.

== Membership ==
As of 2023, the party had 4,040 members, of which 3,006 were men and 1,040 women.

== Electoral results ==
=== Jordanian Parliament ===
House of Representatives
| Election | Votes | % | Seats | +/– | Position | Outcome | Leader |
| 2024 | 93,688 | 5.72% | 21 / 138 | ▲21 (new party) | 2nd | | |

== See also ==
- List of political parties in Jordan
