= Parliament of Jordan =

Bicameral legislature of Jordan

Coordinates: 31°57′44.4″N 35°54′43.2″E

Jordanian Parliament مجلس الأمة Majlis Al-Umma
- 20th Parliament of Jordan

Type
- Type: Bicameral
- Houses: Senate; House of Representatives
- Term limits: 4 years

History
- Founded: January 1, 1952

Leadership
- President of the Senate: Faisal Al-Fayez, Independent since 7 November 2016
- Speaker of the House of Representatives: Ahmed Safadi, Independent since November 15, 2022

Structure
- Seats: 207 members: 69 senators 138 representatives
- Senate political groups: Independent (69)
- House of Representatives political groups: Umma Party (31); National Charter Party (21); Eradah Party (19); Progress Party (8); Al-Islah Party (7); National Union Movement (5); Blessed Land Party (2); Jordanian Labor Party (2); Growth Party (1); Jordan Civil Democratic Party (1); Labor Party (1); Youth Party (1); Independent (39)

Elections
- Senate voting system: Appointed by the King
- House of Representatives voting system: Proportional representation, one third for political parties nationwide, and two-thirds for local lists (18 quotas reserved for women, 12 for Christians, 3 for Circassians and Chechens)
- Last House of Representatives election: 10 September 2024
- Next House of Representatives election: 2028

Meeting place
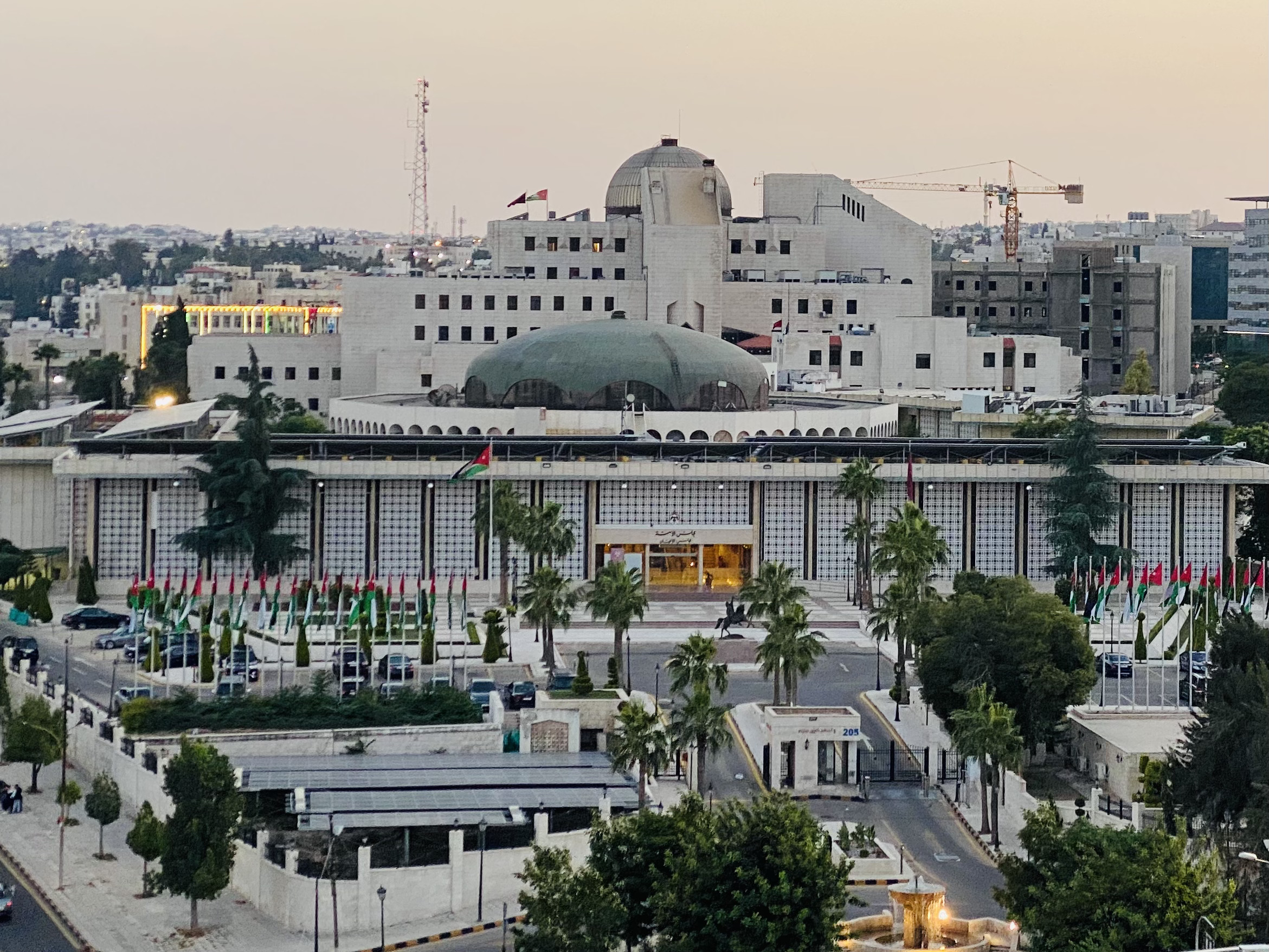
- Parliament building in Al-Abdali, Amman

Website
- www.parliament.jo

The Parliament of Jordan (Arabic: مجلس الأمة Majlis Al-Umma) is the bicameral legislature of Jordan. Established by the 1952 Constitution, the legislature consists of two houses: the Senate (Arabic: مجلس الأعيان Majlis Al-Aayan) and the House of Representatives (Arabic: مجلس النواب Majlis Al-Nuwaab).

The Senate has 69 members, all of whom are directly appointed by the king, while the House of Representatives has 138 elected members, with nine seats reserved for Christians, three for Chechen and Circassian minorities, and fifteen for women. The members of both houses serve for four-year terms.

== History ==
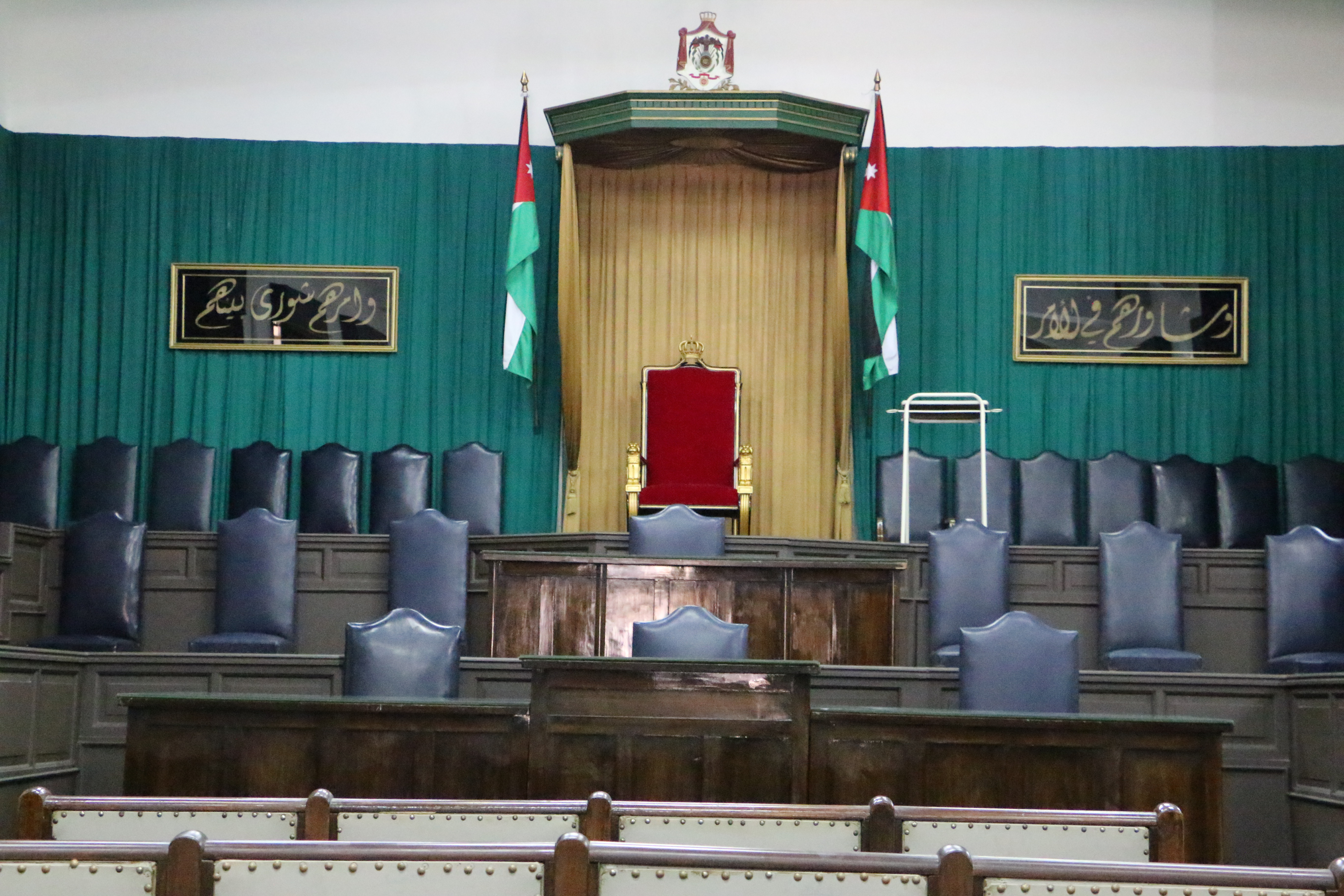
Old hall of the Parliament of Jordan from 1949 till 1974 located now in the Museum of Parliamentary Life.

As a developing constitutional monarchy, Jordan has survived the trials and tribulations of Middle Eastern politics. The Jordanian public has experienced limited democracy since gaining independence in 1946 however the population has not suffered as others have under dictatorships imposed by some Arab regimes. After the 1948 Arab–Israeli War, Palestinian refugees in the West Bank (and on the East Bank) were given Jordanian citizenship on the same basis as existing residents. However, many of the refugees continued to live in camps and relied on UNRWA assistance for sustenance. Palestinian refugees constituted more than a third of the kingdom's population of 1.5 million.

The 1952 Constitution provided for citizens of Jordan to form and join political parties. Such rights were suspended in 1967 when a state of emergency was declared and martial law and suspension of Parliament, continuing until it was repealed in 1989. In the Jordanian parliament, the West and East Banks received 30 seats each, having roughly equal populations. The first elections were held on 11 April 1950. Although the West Bank wouldn't be annexed for another two weeks, its residents were permitted to vote. The last Jordanian elections in which West Bank residents would vote were those of April 1967, but their parliamentary representatives would continue in office until 1988, when West Bank seats were finally abolished.

On 30 July 1988, King Hussein dissolved Jordan's lower house of parliament, half of whose members represented constituencies in the Israeli-occupied West Bank. On 31 July 1988, King Hussein announced the severance of all legal and administrative ties with the West Bank, except for the Jordanian sponsorship of the Muslim and Christian holy sites in Jerusalem, and recognised the PLO's claim to the State of Palestine. In his speech to the nation held on that day he announced his decision and explained that this decision was made with the aim of helping the Palestinian people establishing their own independent state.

Subsequent civil unrest followed with Prime Minister Zaid al-Rifai alleged to have used heavy-handed tactics against the population which resulted in riots in April 1989. After the riots had subsided the King fired al-Rifai and announced elections for later that year. The King's action to re-convene parliamentary elections was considered a significant move forward in enabling the Jordanian public to have greater freedoms and democracy. This was labelled by the think tank Freedom House as, "the Arab World's most promising experiment in political liberalization and reform".

The resumption of the parliamentary election was reinforced by new laws governing the media and publishing as well as fewer restrictions on freedoms of expression. Following the legalization of political parties in 1992, 1993 saw the first multi-party elections held since 1956. The country is now one of the most politically open in the Middle East permitting opposition parties such as the Islamic Action Front (IAF), the political wing of the Jordanian Muslim Brotherhood. The influence of the IAF significantly reduced in 2007 when their parliamentary representation fell from seventeen to six. The IAF boycotted the 2010 and 2013 elections in protest at the one voice electoral system. The king still holds the true levers of power, appointing members of the Senate and has the right to replace the prime minister, as King Abdullah II of Jordan had done in April 2005.

It has been argued that the influence of tribalism in determining Parliament election results in Jordan should not be overlooked; it is stronger than political affiliations. Tribal identity has a strong influence over Jordanian life: "…identities remain the primary driving forces of decision making at the level of the individual, the community, and the state".

In 2016, King Abdullah II dissolved Parliament, and named Hani Al-Mulki as Prime Minister.

In 2018, following mass protests over tax reforms, Al-Mulki would then resign, and was replaced by Omar Razzaz.

== Legislative procedure ==
Both houses can initiate debates and vote on legislation. Proposals are referred by the Prime Minister to the House of Representatives where they are either accepted, amended or rejected. Every proposal is referred to a committee of the lower house for consideration. If it is approved, it is referred to the government to draft in the form of a bill and submit it to the House of Representatives. If approved by this House, it is passed to the Senate for debate and vote. If the Senate gives its approval, the King can either grant consent or refuse. In this case the bill goes back to the House of Representatives where the review and voting process is repeated. If both houses pass the bill by a two-thirds majority it becomes an Act of Parliament overriding the king's veto. Article 95 of the Constitution empowers both houses to submit legislation to the government in the form of a draft law.

The Constitution does not provide a strong system of checks and balances within which the Jordanian Parliament can assert its role in relationship to the king. During the suspension of Parliament between 2001 and 2003, the scope of King Abdullah II's power was demonstrated with the passing of 110 temporary laws. Two of these laws dealt with election law and reduced the power of Parliament.

== Term ==
Senators have terms of four years and are appointed by the king and can be reappointed. Prospective senators must be at least forty years old and have held senior positions in either the government or military. Appointed senators have included former prime ministers and members of the House of Representatives. Deputies are elected to serve four-year terms. Deputy candidates must be older than thirty-five and cannot be related to the king and must not have any financial interests in governmental contracts.

== Political parties in the House of Representatives ==
Despite the reforms of 1989, pro-monarchist independents had continuously dominated the House of Representatives until the 2024 Jordanian general election. In the 2016 election, for example, pro-monarchist independents won a majority of seats, as has been the case in previous elections, with only 215 candidates out of a total of 1,252 running with the explicit support of a political party. The role of parties is significantly limited by institutional factors as well, such as the broad authority vested in the king alongside overrepresentation in rural areas, resulting in a political party struggling to win control of the government solely in elections.

The only political party that plays a role in the House of Representatives is the Islamic Action Front (IAF). Political parties can be seen to represent four sections, being Islamism, leftism, Arab nationalism and conservatism. There are 34 registered political parties in Jordan including the Jordanian Arab Democratic Party, Jordanian Socialist Party, Islamic Centre Party, but these have little impact on the political process. Legislation regarding political parties was passed in March 2007 which made it a requirement that all political parties had to report to the Ministry of the Interior and have a minimum of five hundred founding members from at least five governorates. This was seen by some as a direct threat to a number of the political parties which are small in membership.

Public disillusion with existing political parties has been highlighted in research carried out by the Centre for Strategic Studies at Jordan University, concluding that in 2007, only 9.7% of respondents felt that the political parties represented their political, economic and social aspirations. Furthermore, 80% of respondents believed that 'none' of the political parties were 'qualified to form a government'.

== Permanent committees ==
The Jordanian parliament consists of three political committees, each responsible for Legal, Financial, Administrative and Foreign Affairs. Both houses have the ability to create committees when required.

== Current weakness ==
- Low voter turnout has indicated that there is a problem with public participation in the democratic process, with voter turnout slowly decreasing every election.
- Practical issues have reduced the effect of Parliament with brief parliamentary sessions (November to March) and a lack of resources and support for members of both houses.
- There has been a lack of involvement in Jordanian politics from political parties, significantly worsening following the boycotting of previous elections by the IAF in 1997, which represented one of the few major political parties in Jordan as the vast majority of elected parliamentarians ran as independents based on tribal lines or were related to the ruling Hashemite dynasty.

== Democratization ==
The Jordanian Parliament and its form of democracy are young in comparison to their western contemporaries. According to Kaaklini et al. (1999), "Since 1989, it [Jordanian Parliament] has become a more credible, representative, and influential institution. Still, serious constitutional, political, and internal hurdles continue to prevent it from enjoying the prerogatives and from performing the range of functions that are appropriate for a legislature in a democratic system". Judged against other states in the Middle East, Jordan has made significant progress towards a democratic system of government.

As of 1998, it has been argued that the Jordanian Parliament is part of a democracy that has not been achieved by other states in the Middle East. However, in comparison to elected democracies as associated with 'western' nations, Jordan may not be considered to have occurred as the king continues to dominate national politics, "…1989 elections brought unparalleled political liberalization and somewhat greater democratic input… although the political supremacy of the palace has been rendered less visible by the more active role of parliament, it is clear that a fundamental transfer of power into elected hands has not yet occurred.".

== See also ==
- List of presidents of the Senate of Jordan
- List of speakers of the House of Representatives of Jordan
- 2024 Jordanian general election
- 2020 Jordanian general election
- 2016 Jordanian general election
- 2013 Jordanian general election
- 2010 Jordanian general election
- Politics of Jordan
- List of legislatures by country
