= Toujan al-Faisal =

Human rights activist, television journalist

Tujān al-Fayṣal
- Born: 1948 (age 77–78)
- Title: Member of Parliament
- Term: 1993–1997

Toujan al-Faisal (Adyghe: Туджэн Фэйсэл; Arabic: توجان الفيصل, Tujān al-Fayṣal) (born in 1948) is a human rights activist and a former TV journalist, who was Jordan's first female member of parliament.

== Early life ==
Al-Faisal was born in 1948.

== Political career ==
Al-Faisal was elected to the Jordanian parliament when the 1993 elections were resumed after the repeal of martial law. She served as a member of the parliament from 1993 to 1997. In the following election, the government is said to have interfered to prevent her being reelected.

== Alleged apostasy ==
In 1989, an apostasy case against Toujan al-Faisal was heard in the first instance sharia court of south Amman. Jordan has no apostasy law but the petitioners sought that she be declared an apostate, and divorced from her husband. The court eventually ruled that it had no jurisdiction in the matter. On appeal in 1990, the sharia court of appeal, which had agreed to hear the section of the petition relating to divorce on the grounds of alleged apostasy, found that there was no evidence of apostasy and dismissed the case.

=== Activism and arrest ===
On 6 March 2002, al-Faisal published an open letter to King Abullah II on the website of the Houston-based newspaper Arab Times, accusing the then Jordanian Prime Minister Ali Abu Ragheb of corruption. The letter was later reprinted in the Islamist weekly Al Sabil. She claimed that the recent doubling of the cost of government-mandated automobile insurance was intended to benefit the major insurance companies in Jordan (several of which were owned or partly owned by the Prime Minister himself).

She was arrested on 16 March. The State Security Court prosecutor freed her on bail on 27 March but she was arrested again two days later on the eve of a press conference she was about to hold at her home. On 16 May 2002, she was convicted by the State Security Court on charges of "tarnishing the Jordanian state", defamation of the judiciary, "uttering words" before another deemed to be "detrimental to his religious feeling", "publishing and broadcasting false information abroad which could be detrimental to the reputation of the state", and inciting "disturbances and killings." She was sentenced to 18 months imprisonment, the maximum sentence allowed on such charges. She was convicted under a law promulgated through a provisional royal decree two weeks after the 11 September 2001 attacks. The law not only expanded the definition of "terrorism" but also further restricted freedom of expression in Jordan. Amnesty International condemned the prison term imposed on her:

This is a sad day for freedom of expression in Jordan. Toujan al-Faisal has been imprisoned solely for exercising her fundamental right to express her opinion. [...] Sentencing Toujan al-Faisal has breached international human rights treaties which Jordan has ratified, [...] As we feared, the Jordanian courts are using new measures supposedly introduced to fight 'terrorism' to clamp down on the individual's exercise of the right to criticize government policy.

Toujan was reportedly maltreated in jail. This caused an outcry of human-right groups within and outside Jordan.

In prison she went on hunger strike, during which she lost 12 kg (1 st 12 lb) in less than a month. On 26 June 2002, after 29 days of hunger strike, she was freed from prison by a special royal pardon. The royal pardon did not annul her conviction. Speaking to BBC News Online, she said she was determined to walk out of hospital on her daughter's arm. And she continued to state "I refused a wheelchair because I don't like the look, the attitude of weakness."

=== Attempt to rejoin parliament ===
The 20 May 2003 of the Election Commission decided not to allow her to stand as a candidate in the parliamentary elections of 17 June 2003. Al-Faisal decided to file a request before the Kingdom's Court of First Instance. On 24 May 2003, the court delivered a judgment rejecting the request. Al-Faisal's application was rejected due to her previous conviction, on the grounds that she had previously committed a non-political offense.

The International Federation for Human Rights (FIDH) considered that the Election Committee and the Court decisions were based on an unfair condemnation, and Amnesty International stated that "Toujan al-Faisal is being denied her right to stand for elections on account of an unfair trial for expressing non-violent political beliefs."
