= 2003 Jordanian general election =

← 1997	17 June 2003	2007 →

150 to the House of Representatives

General elections were held in Jordan on 17 June 2003. They were the fourth contest held after the political liberalization started in 1989 and the first elections to take place since 1997. The number of voters who cast their ballots constituted almost 58.8 percent of registered voters, a record high in the last years, who total 2,325,496 of the country's 5.4 million citizens. The Kingdom's most prominent tribal representatives carried a large majority of the seats. The highest turnout, 86 percent, was registered in Karak, while the lowest ratio of voters, 44.62 percent, was in Amman.

== Political Climate in the Region ==
The elections were first scheduled for November 2001, but were delayed due to political instability in the region. In fact, the second Intifada started on 28 September 2000 and King Abdullah found it adequate to defer the parliamentary elections, the Constitution of Jordan allows the monarch to postpone the elections for a maximum of two years. The parliament was also solved by a Royal Decree in 2001.

== Election law ==
Elections Seats Scheme of 2003 was established under Election Law No.34 of 2001. It added six seats to women, lowered the voting age from 19 to 18, resized electoral districts raising their number from 20 to 45, and re-approved the one-person one-vote electoral system. Many parties and political figures found this law unfair. The law reserves special ethnical quotas for Circassians, Chechens and Christians, the parliamentary seat distribution is shown in the following table:

Governorate	Districts	Muslims	Circassian or Chechens	Christians	Total
Amman	7	20	2	1	23
Irbid	9	15	0	1	16
Balqa	4	8	0	2	10
Karak	6	8	0	2	10
Ma'an	3	4	0	0	4
Zarqa	4	8	1	1	10
Mafraq	1	4	0	0	4
Tafileh	2	4	0	0	4
Madaba	2	3	0	1	4
Jerash	1	4	0	0	4
Ajloun	2	3	0	1	4
Aqaba	1	2	0	0	4
North Bedouin Tribes	1	3	0	0	3
Center Bedouin Tribes	1	3	0	0	3
South Bedouin Tribes	1	3	0	0	3
Minimum Women Quota					6
Total	45	92	3	9	110

== Women Participation ==
A special quota system has been created to ensure women would be elected to the lower chamber, six seats were assigned at national level, i.e. the six women with the highest percentage nationwide won the six reserved seats. Many women ran for the elections, but none won a seat over the special quota.

== Parties and Candidates ==
In 2003 elections, there were 765 candidates competing for the 110 seats. The major opposition party, the Islamic Action Front did not boycott the elections, as did other opposition parties. Most candidates were independents of various tendencies, both non-partisans and tribal leaders.

== Results ==
Party	Votes	%	Seats
Islamic Action Front	139,229	10.37	17
Independents and others	1,203,770	89.63	87
Appointed women members			6
Total	1,342,999	100.00	110
Total votes	1,342,999	–	
Registered voters/turnout	2,325,496	57.75	
Source: IPU

== Assembly of Senators ==
The number of Senators cannot be more than half of deputies, therefore 55 senators were constitutionally appointed by the king. Zaid al-Rifai was appointed as Spokesman of the House and 4 women were included in the upper house.
