= 2010 Jordanian general election =

← 2007	9 November 2010	2013 →

150 to the House of Representatives
- Turnout: 53%

Early general elections were held in Jordan on 9 November 2010 following the dissolution of the previous parliament by King Abdullah II in November 2009; the elections having not been due until November 2011. A majority of the seats were won by pro-government or tribal candidates who were seen as likely to support the government's agenda. Seventeen candidates were from opposition parties, excluding the Islamic Action Front. Seventy-eight MPs were first time parliamentarians. Voter turnout was 53%.

== Background ==
In 2009, King Abdullah II dissolved parliament on the grounds that it failed to "address the people's needs" only halfway through a four-year mandate, and also for "inept handling of legislation and failing to address poverty and unemployment."

In 1991, the National Accord was signed, 2 years after political parties were legalised and an election was called. In return for agreeing to work under the government instead of against it, political freedoms and legalisation of the parties were allowed. However, there had been allegations of repeated violations of the pact and attempts to undermine the election. An electoral law created in 1993 effectively gave the rural areas a larger representation at the expense of the urban areas and had in effect created sub-identities and split the country into Palestinian areas, most of whom tended to side with the Islamic Action Front or leftist and pan-Arab nationalists, and Bedouin areas.

== Campaign ==
There were 763 candidates in the election, with 75% of incumbent MPs running again.

The main opposition, the Muslim Brotherhood-affiliated Islamic Action Front, announced on 30 July 2010 it would boycott the polls due to unfair election laws which gave undue weight to the rural, sparsely populated areas, and other issues. The "one-man-one-vote" law was seen as "engineered to deprive the Islamic Action Front of votes." Seven IAF candidates defied the boycott and ran as independents, with the IAF expelling five of them. As a result of the boycotts, including the main opposition group, the poll was viewed with skepticism. As a result of the calls for a boycott and allegations of fraud, a low voter turnout was expected, particularly amongst the Palestinian population.

== Opinion polls ==
The result was expected to be a predictable win for pro-government candidates and tribesmen with strong ties to the monarchy.

== Conduct ==
For the first time the government allowed international observers into the country, with 250 in attendance. The National Democratic Institute reported that there had been a "clear improvement" compared with the 2007 elections.

On election day, there were 53 instances of violence across the country, with fighting between tribes loyal to different candidates led to at least one death and more injures.

== Analysis ==
An Al Jazeera analysis said that while the election may have succeeded in "manufacturing consent", the costs may be much higher in that it fomented an "atmosphere of mutual suspicion that undermines national unity and social cohesion at a time when Jordan needs to confront tremors of regional instability."
