= Eradah Party =

Eradah Party حزب إرادة
- Abbreviation: EP
- Secretary-General: Nidal Al-Batayneh
- Founded: 2022
- Headquarters: Amman
- Ideology: Social market economy Social liberalism Environmentalism
- Political position: Center
- Colours: Navy blue
- House of Representatives: 19 / 138

Website
- eradahjo.com

The Eradah Party (Arabic: حزب إرادة, lit. 'Will Party') is a Jordanian political party. It is as of 2024 the third largest party in the House of Representatives.

== History ==
The party first formed in 2023, and soon reached more than 16,000 members.

During the 2024 Jordanian general election, the party won 19 seats in the House of Representatives and became the third largest party.

On 6 September 2025, party members of the Progress Party voted in favor of merging with the Eradah Party to establish the Mubadara Party (meaning "initiative").

== Ideology ==
The Eradah party claims itself to be centrist. The party calls for a social market economy that seeks freedom for individuals and privately owned production companies, but with government controls to ensure fair competition and working conditions, protection of the rights of employers and workers, and social services for all individuals by the state. The goal is to achieve economic growth while reducing inflation and unemployment.

The Eradah party is in favor of environmentalism, in which it has opposed an amendment to the tax system of Jordan it claims "reduces taxes on gasoline cars and gradually increases them on electric cars" further claiming the amendment is "an unjustified retreat from global and national economic trends towards supporting environmental sustainability and innovation in the field of transportation and energy".

Some party leaders and candidates also served as former government officials or cabinet ministers, and the party may represent "an establishment-oriented bloc" competing against the Islamist Islamic Action Front.

== See also ==
- List of political parties in Jordan
