= Jordan Royal Guard =

Elite military unit

Jordan Special Royal Guard Command قيادة الحرس الملكي الخاص
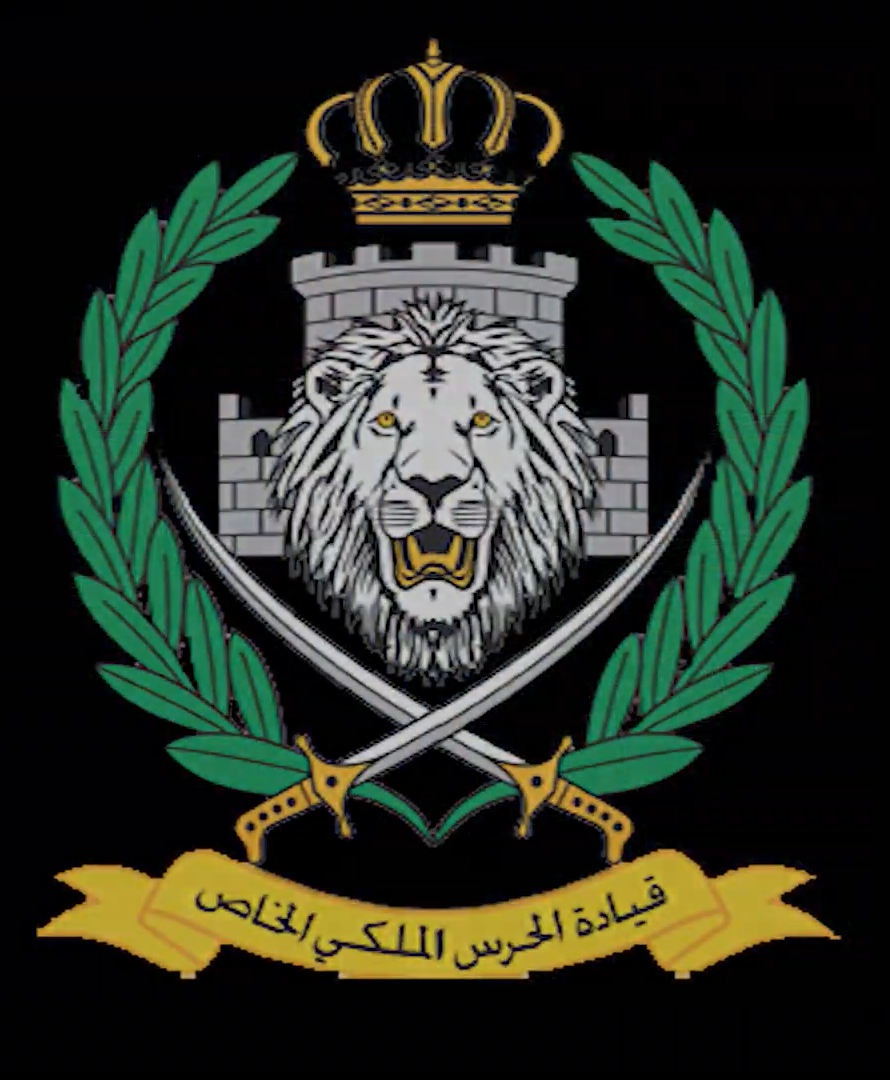
- Emblem of the Jordanian Royal Guard Command
- Founded: October 1920
- Current form: March 1956
- Headquarters: Amman

Leadership
- Commander: King Abdullah II

Related articles
- History: Desert Force; Arab Legion; Transjordan Frontier Force
- Ranks: Jordanian military ranks

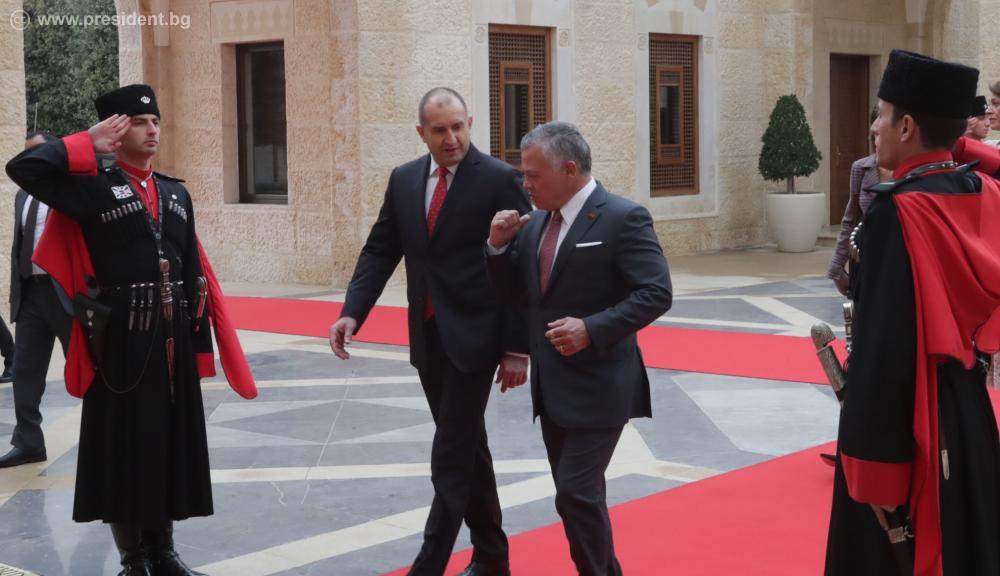
The King's Circassian Bodyguard

Jordan's Special Royal Guard Command is the royal guard component of the Jordanian Armed Forces, and is composed of two infantry combat brigades, one ceremonial bodyguard, one training center, and a horse mounted unit. The combat brigades are divided into armored infantry and fire support battalions as well as a special air defense battalion. The Royal Guard Brigade is one of the most elite units of the Jordanian Army and is responsible for the protection of the Hashemite dynasty.

== Organizational structure ==
=== Hamza Ibn Abd Al-Muttalib (Sayed Al-Shuhada) Royal Guard Brigade ===
The Royal Guard Brigade is based in Amman. Its members are largely recruited from the most loyal tribes of the east bank of Jordan. It is not to be confused with the king's Circassian Bodyguard who, though part of the Special Royal Guard Command, are a separate unit assigned to ceremonial duties within Jordan's various royal palaces.

Brigade Structure:

- Brigade HQ
- His Majesty Special Security Group (مجموعة الأمن الخاص لجلالة القائد الأعلى)
- Muhammadiyah District Group (مجموعة منطقة المحمدية)
- Al-Maqqar Ala'amir District Group (مجموعة منطقة المقر العامر)
- Fire Support Group (مجموعة الإسناد الناري)
- Honor Guard Group (مجموعة حرس الشرف)
- Special Royal Guard Engineering Unit (وحدة هندسة الحرس الملكي الخاص)
- Royal Guard Knights (Horse Mounted) Unit (وحدة الفرسان)
- Royal Guard Training Center

==== His Majesty’s Special Security Group ====
The Special Royal Guard Command is under the direct personal control of the King. His Majesty’s Special Security Group is a unit within the Royal Guard Brigade that is responsible for the close personal security of the king and is equivalent to U.S. Secret Service. His Majesty Special Security Group accompanies the King 24 hours seven days a week and maintains security at his offices and various palaces. It was formerly commanded by the King's brother, Prince Ali.

=== Circassian Bodyguard ===
The Circassian bodyguard currently consists of 14 men selected from among the Circassian tribes of Jordan who currently number about 100,000 people. New recruits must complete eight months of training in self-defense, security, palace protocol and military techniques before joining the bodyguard. The guards wear two ceremonial swords: a long blade bearing an engraving reading "If God helps you, no one can overcome you," and another blade nicknamed "the scent of death".

== Commanders ==
- Brigadier Hussein Majali (?)
- Lieutenant-Colonel Prince Ali bin Hussein (1999 - January 28, 2008)
