= Hana Hussien Naghawi =

Jordanian civil engineering professor

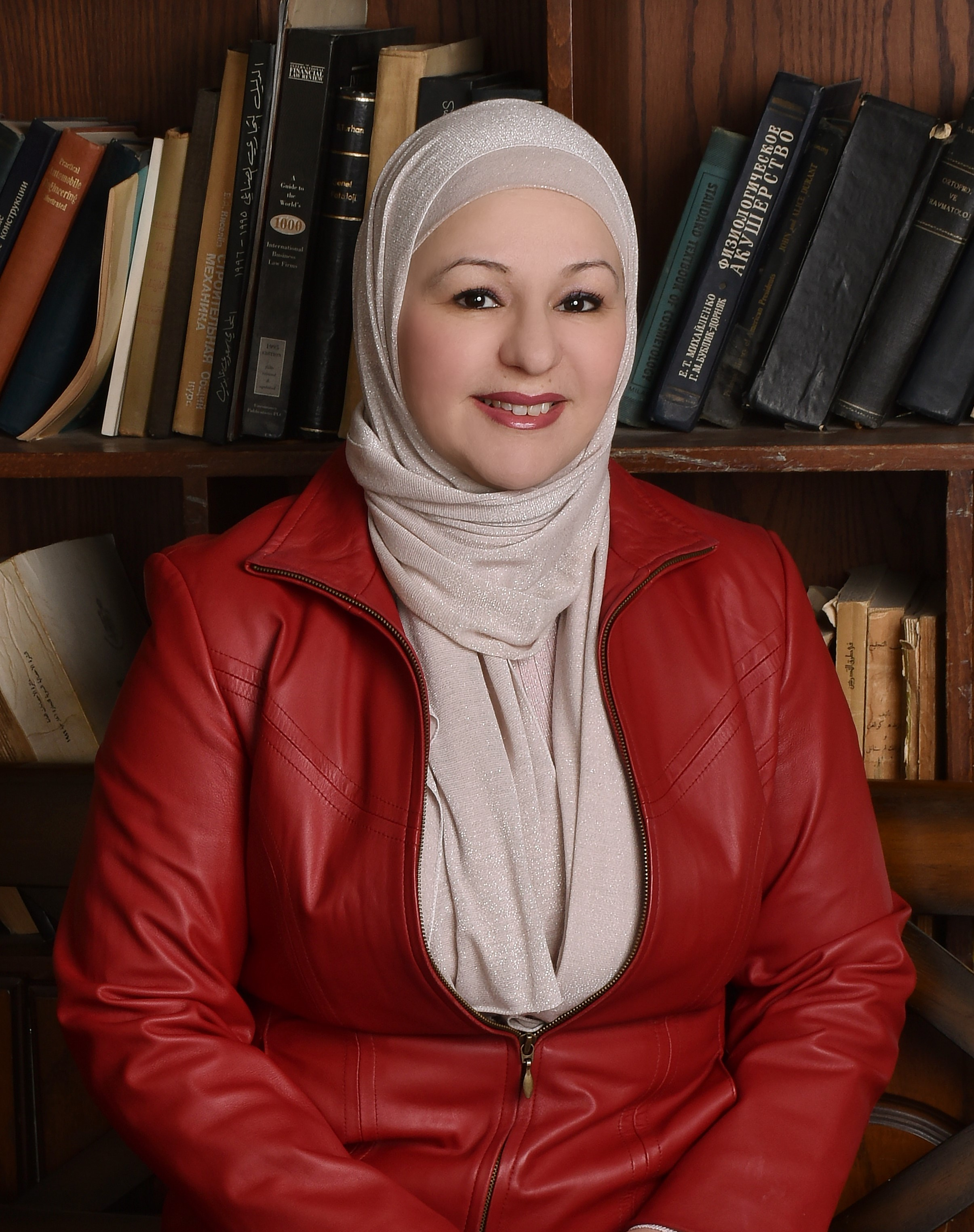
- Prof. Hana Naghawi

Personal details
- Citizenship: Jordan

Hana Hussein Naghawi (born March 3, 1971), a Jordanian civil engineering professor of Circassian origin.

On October 14, 2019, Naghawi became the first woman to be awarded a professor's position in civil engineering in Jordan. Louisiana State University indicated on its website that Naghawi "made history." Naghawi was also the first woman to awarded a professorship in all engineering disciplines within the University of Jordan, after working in university teaching for nine years.
