= Ahmad Ramzi =

Ahmad Ramzi Ibn Abdin
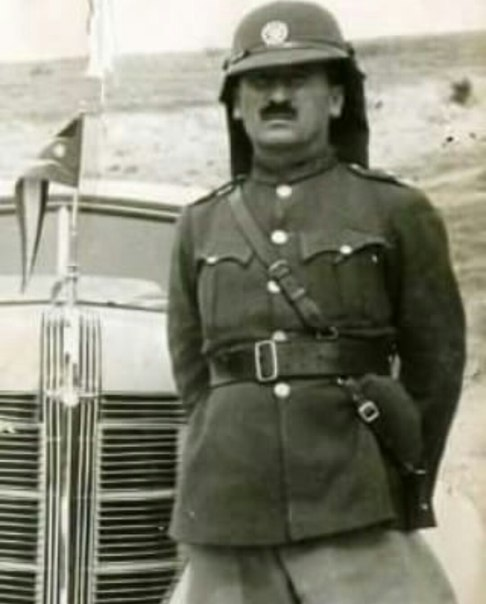
- Native name: Гонукаев Ӏабдин Ахьмад
- Born: 1893 Alkhan-Khutor, Chechnya
- Died: 1969 (aged 75–76) Zarqa, Jordan
- Rank: General

Ahmad Ramzi Ibn Abdin (Chechen: Гонукаев Ӏабдин Ахьмад; 1893 - 1969) was a general in the Jordanian Armed forces of Chechen descent. Ahmad Ramzi was a Hero of Jordan recipient.

== Biography ==
Ahmad Ramzi was born in Alkhan-Khutor to a middle income Chechen family.

In 1903 he and his family had to relocate to the Ottoman Empire. From 1912 to 1916 Ahmad Ramzi served in the Ottoman army (where he received his first officer rank). From the span of 1918 to 1920 he served in the army Faisal I. In 1920 when Abdullah ibn Hussein arrived in the city of Ma'an Ramzi joined the new emir and took part in the battle of Maysalun.

During the 1936–1939 Arab revolt in Palestine he was appointed military governor of Damascus. At the request of King Abdullah I of Jordan he added “Ramzi” to his name to signify his entry into the military elite of the Jordanian army. For some time he served as Minister of Defense. Subsequently, he created and led the Jordanian police as the Minister of the Interior. His three brothers and son were also officers in the Jordanian army.

== Legacy ==
In the city of Amman there is a street named after Ahmad Ramzi.

In 2019 a school in Ahmad's hometown of Alkhan-Khutor was named after him.
