= Islamic Centre Party =

Islamic political party in Jordan

Islamic Centre Party حزب الوسط الاسلامي
- Registered: December 2001
- Headquarters: Amman
- Ideology: Islamic democracy Arab nationalism Arab-Islamic nationalism
- Chamber of Deputies: 0 / 130

Website
- http://www.wasat-party.org/

The Islamic Centre Party (Arabic: حزب الوسط الاسلامي Hizb al-Wasat al-Islamiy; sometimes translated as the Islamic Centrist Party) is a political party in Jordan. The party was given official licensing by the Jordanian government in December 2001. With the introduction of the new political party laws the party was re-licensed in 2008.

== Policies ==
The Islamic Centre Party seeks to promote political, economic, educational and social reforms on the basis of Islamic law.

The party attempts to target members of the Islamic movement. However, it is independent from the Muslim Brotherhood. The party supports a moderate form of Islam and criticizes extreme religious ideologies that do not support pluralism and promote violence. The party promotes itself as an Islamic Party that is more moderate than the Islamic Action Front.

The Islamic Centre Party advocates the strengthening of democracy in Jordan. The party promotes pluralism, the separation of powers, and the freedom of the press. It also calls for the increasing political role of women in Jordan. Finally, the party is adamant about the creation of a Palestinian state.

== Representation ==
The party had two members in the Jordanian Parliament from 2003–2007. As of 2009, the Party has members in municipal councils throughout Jordan.

Following the Jordanian general election in 2013, the party became the largest party in parliament.

== See also ==
- List of political parties in Jordan
- List of Islamic political parties
