= Circassians in Jordan =

Branch of the Circassian diaspora in Jordan

Иорданием ис Адыгэхэр (Adyghe) الشركس في الأردن (Arabic)
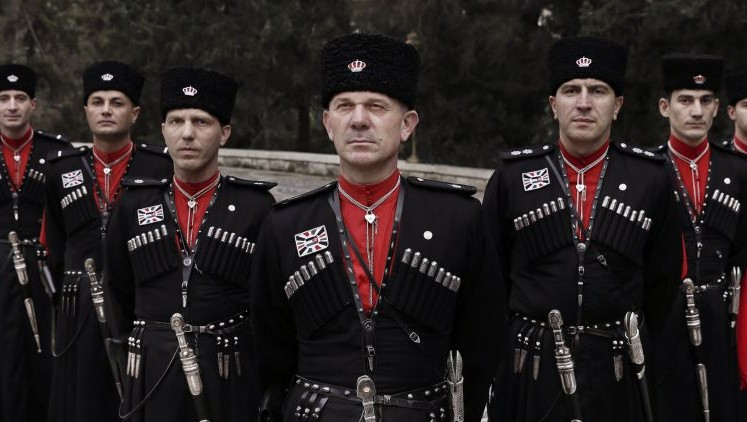
- Circassian guards of Jordan, tasked with guarding the Jordanian king

Total population
- 100,000–170,000

Languages
- Circassian, Jordanian Arabic

Religion
- Sunni Islam

Related ethnic groups
- Abkhazians, Abazins, Chechens in Jordan

Circassians in Jordan (Adyghe: Иорданием ис Адыгэхэр, romanized: Yiwerdaniém yis Adıǵexer; Arabic: الشركس في الأردن) are descendants of Circassian refugees who arrived in Jordan in the late 19th century after the Circassian genocide in the 1860s and the Russo-Turkish War (1877–1878). They settled in Jordan, then a part of Ottoman Syria, in and around Amman and Jerash. Circassians are credited with founding modern Amman as the city had been previously abandoned.

== History ==
=== Exodus ===
Circassians began entering the Ottoman Empire en masse during the expansion of the Tsarist Russian Empire into their Caucasian homeland during the 1850s. An 1860 agreement between the Ottomans and the Russians mandated the immigration of 40,000–50,000 Circassians into Ottoman territory. However, between 800,000 and 1,200,000 Muslim Circassians entered and settled in the Ottoman Empire, of whom some 175,000 were resettled by the government in the Empire's predominantly Christian Balkan territories in 1864. The Balkan Crisis of 1876, which led to the Russo–Turkish War of 1877–1878, was partly attributed to the killings of Bulgarian Christians by Circassian settlers. During the subsequent Russian occupation of Bulgaria and Eastern Rumelia the Circassians were expelled from the Balkans, which was formalized by the Treaty of Berlin in 1878. Coinciding with the crisis in the Balkans, further waves of Circassians and Chechens from the Caucasus and Turkmens from Central Asia were fleeing Russian rule and becoming refugees in eastern Anatolia.

=== Settlement in Transjordan ===
With Ottoman territories decreasing and tens of thousands of refugees overcrowding the cities of Anatolia, Thrace and Macedonia, the imperial government resolved to resettle refugees along the peripheral areas of the Levantine provinces. The policy of establishing Circassian agricultural communities in grain-producing regions in Syria Vilayet was partly motivated by the Empire's loss of its key agricultural region, the Balkans. It was also driven by Ottoman efforts to centralize control over the Empire, which included attempts to sedentarize the nomadic Bedouin of the Syrian steppe and impose control over the practically autonomous Druze, Alawite and Maronite communities of the coastal mountain ranges; the settlements of the Circassians, along with other migrant communities such as the Kurds, Assyrians and Armenians were strategically located to serve as a buffer between the dissident communities. In 1878, 50,000 Circassians were transported by sea to the Levantine coast from Constantinople, Salonica and Kavalla. From there about 25,000 were sent to the southern parts of Syria Vilayet, mainly the Balqa (part of modern Jordan), the Golan Heights and the area around Tiberias. Their transportation and settlement came under the supervision of the Damascus-based governor. Four piasters per taxpayer were levied toward financing the immigration committees charged with settling the Circassians and others. The Circassians were initially housed in schools and mosques until their resettlement. Numerous migrants died in transit from disease and poor conditions.

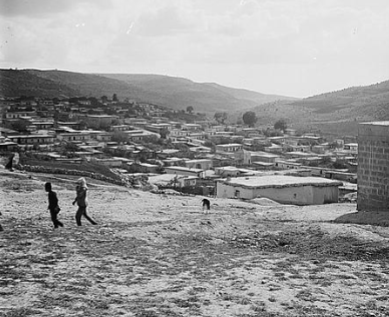
The Circassian settlement of Wadi Sir, pictured here in 1900, was established in 1880.

The Circassians settled close to water sources and grain fields. Between 1878 and 1884, three Circassian villages were founded: Amman (1878) and Wadi al-Seer (1880) in the Balqa and Jerash (1884) in Jabal Ajlun, and a Turkmen village, al-Ruman, was established in 1884. Amman, abandoned during the 14th century, was revived by the Circassians. The first group of Circassians belonged to the Shapsug dialect group. They were joined later by Circassians belonging to the Kabardia and Abzakh groups. During a second major wave of migration in 1901–1906, which also included many Chechen refugees from the Caucasus, five mixed Circassian and Chechen settlements were founded: Naour (1901), Zarqa (1902), Russeifa (1905), Swaylih (1905) and Sukhna (1906), all located in the vicinity of Amman. The new migrants also settled in the villages founded during the first migration wave. Amman experienced a decline from 500 settlers to 150 in the first three months due to inhospitable conditions. Those who remained lived in caves and among the Roman-era ruins, exposed to typhoid, malaria, and typhus. Amman had been relatively isolated from other Circassian communities, the closest being Quneitra about 100 kilometers (62 mi) to the northwest. By 1893 new arrivals boosted the population to around 1,000.

The lands on which the Circassians settled had served as winter campgrounds for Bedouin tribes who did not possess property deeds. The Bedouin and the townspeople of Salt viewed the Circassians as beneficiaries and agents of the government due to the land grants and exemptions from taxes for a ten-year period they received and the service many took up with the Ottoman Gendarmerie. The Circassians refused to pay the khuwwa (protection fees) solicited by the Bedouin, which entailed a portion of their harvest to the tribes in return for the tribes' "protection". The mutual hostility between the Circassians and their nomadic and settled Arab neighbors led to clashes. Despite the superiority of Bedouin arms and mobility, the Circassians maintained their positions and were feared by the Bedouin and the Salt townspeople, who blamed them for a number of killings.

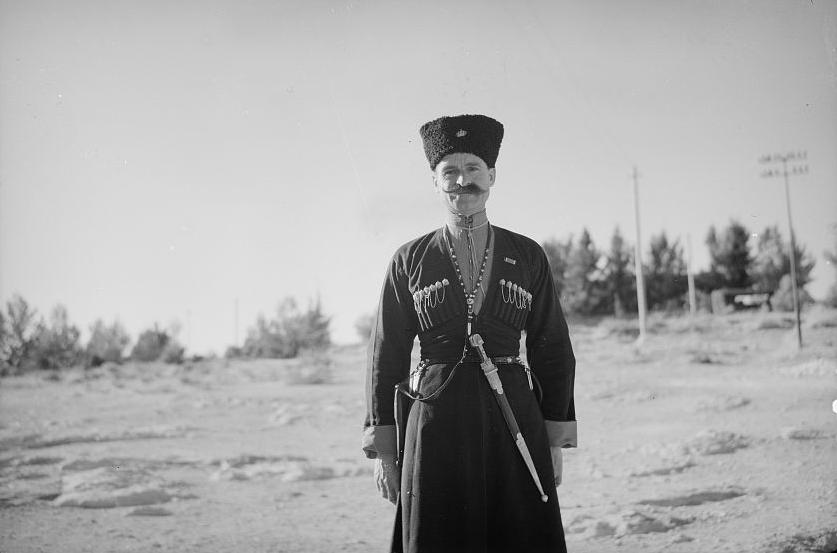
A Circassian guard of Emir Abdullah, founder of the Kingdom of Jordan, 1940

The Circassians in the Balqa proved an integral component in the expansion of government control in the historically autonomous southeastern Levant. For the government, the Circassian settlers served the dual role as a periodic militia used against local rebellions and a key factor in the integration of the local economy through agricultural production, grain transportation, the construction and protection of the Hejaz Railway and service in local administrative bodies. The Circassian town of Amman grew rapidly after the construction of the Hejaz Railway, operational in central Transjordan since 1903, which also brought investment from Salti, Damascene, and Nabulsi merchants. As their numbers increased, the Circassians became a major local power and a number of pacts were formed with the Bedouin, including a mutual defense alliance with the Bani Sakhr in the late 1890s spearheaded by Talal Al-Fayez. The alliance proved instrumental in the Bani Sakhr's intervention in the 1906–1910 conflict between the Circassians and the Balqawiyya tribal confederation. The Circassian, Chechen and Turkmen settlements solidified the new sedentarized order taking place in the Balqa, which also included Salt and Karak townspeople and Bedouin tribesmen establishing their own agricultural and satellite villages. Two new roads linking Jerash and Amman were built via al-Ruman and Swaylih respectively to accommodate the settlers' ox-drawn carts, while secondary roads were built connecting Amman to its satellite Circassian and Chechen villages. Circa World War I there were 5,000–6,000 Circassians in Transjordan.

=== Post-Jordanian independence ===
As Amman has experienced exponential growth and urbanization since Jordan's independence, the Circassian proportion of the city's population currently stands at about 5%. Most Circassians in Jordan formed part of the country's urban middle class. They largely work in the government bureaucracy, military, and intelligence and are given significant representation in Jordan's parliament and executive branch.

== Culture and identity ==
The Circassian settlers mainly spoke the Adyghe dialects of Kabardian, Shapsug, Abzakh and Bzhedug, but there were also Abkhazian and Dagestani language speakers. Historically Circassians identified themselves as "Adyghe" while the term "Circassians" was historically used by outsiders, such as Turks, Arabs, Russians and Europeans. Today the diaspora communities, including the Jordanian Circassians, use both terms interchangeably. The group's cultural identity in Jordan is mainly shaped by their self-images as a displaced people, as settlers, and Muslims. Beginning in the 1950s, Circassian ethnic associations and youth clubs began holding performances centered on the theme of expulsion and emigration from the Caucasus and resettlement in Jordan, which often elicited emotional responses by Circassian audiences. Eventually the performances were made in front of mixed Circassian and Arab spectators in major national cultural events, including the annual Jerash Festival of Arts. The performances typically omit the early conflicts with the indigenous Arabs and focus on the ordeals of the exodus, the first harvests and the construction of the first Circassian homes in Jordan. The self-image promoted is of a brave community of hardy men and women that long endured suffering.

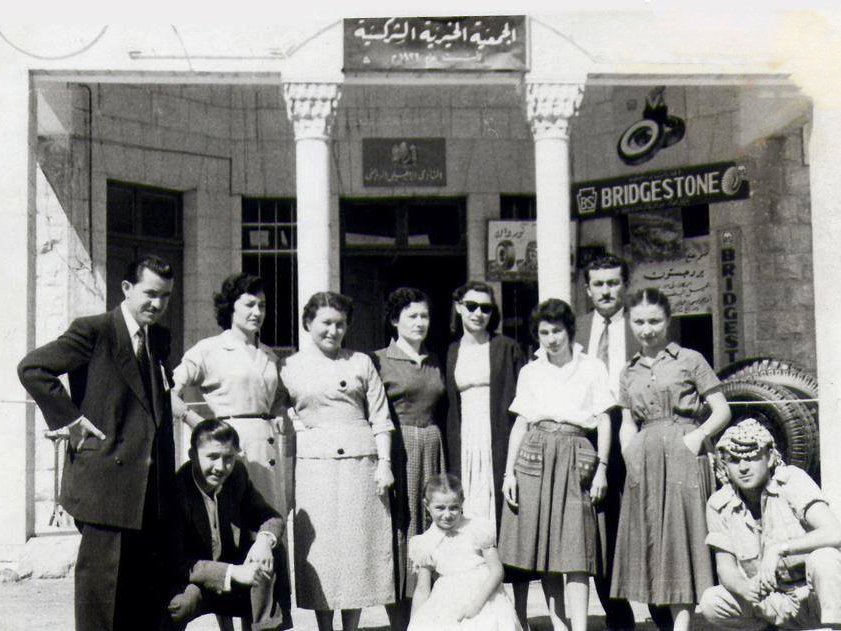
In front of the Circassians Charity Association in Amman, 1958.

In 1932 Jordan's oldest charity, the Circassian Charity Association, was established to assist the poor and grant scholarships to Circassians to study at universities in Kabardino-Balkaria and the Adygea Republic. The Al-Ahli Club, founded in 1944, promoted Circassian engagement in sports and social and cultural events in Jordan and other countries, while the establishment of the Folklore Committee in 1993 helped promote Circassian traditional song and dance. Today, an estimated 17% of the Circassian community in Jordan speak Adyghe.

Circassians, together with Chechens, are mandated 3 seats in the Jordanian parliament. However, Circassians also produce a disproportionate amount of ministers, which some Jordanians regard as an unofficial quota.

== Notable people ==
- Sa'id Mufti, 9th prime minister of Jordan
- Ismael Babouk, first mayor of Amman
- Emanne Beasha, singer
- Toujan al-Faisal, politician and human rights activist, first female member of the Jordanian parliament
- Ahmad Husni Hatoqay, Ddirector of the Jordanian General Intelligence Department
- Mohydeen Izzat Quandour – Writer, film producer and musician
- Amjad Jaimoukha
- Hana Hussien Naghawi, professor of civil engineering
- Hanan Khimish, professor of sociology

== See also ==
- Minorities in Jordan
- Circassian diaspora
- Circassians in Syria

== Bibliography ==
- Hamed-Troyansky, Vladimir (2017). "Circassian Refugees and the Making of Amman, 1878–1914". International Journal of Middle East Studies. 49 (4): 605–623. doi:10.1017/S0020743817000617. S2CID 165801425.
- Hamed-Troyansky, Vladimir (2018). Imperial Refuge: Resettlement of Muslims from Russia in the Ottoman Empire, 1860–1914 (Thesis). Stanford, CA: Stanford University.
- Hanania, Marwan D. (2018). "From Colony to Capital: Reconsidering the Socio-Economic and Political History of Amman, 1878–1928". Middle Eastern Studies. 55: 1–21. doi:10.1080/00263206.2018.1505612. S2CID 150054384.
- Rogan, Eugene L. (1994). "Bringing the State Back: The Limits of Ottoman Rule in Jordan, 1840–1910". In Rogan, Eugene L.; Tell, Tariq (eds.). Village, Steppe and State: The Social Origins of Modern Jordan. London: British Academic Press. ISBN 1-85043-829-3.
- Rogan, Eugene L. (1999). Frontiers of the State in the Late Ottoman Empire: Transjordan, 1850–1921. Cambridge: Cambridge University Press. ISBN 0-521-66312-1.
- Shami, Seteney (July 1994). "Displacement, Historical Memory, and Identity: The Circassians in Jordan". Center for Migration Studies Special Issues. 11 (4): 189–201. doi:10.1111/j.2050-411X.1994.tb00807.x.
- Shami, Seteney (2009). "Historical Processes of Identity Formation: Displacement, Settlement, and Self-Representations of the Circassians in Jordan". Iran & the Caucasus. 13 (1): 141–159. doi:10.1163/160984909X12476379008160. JSTOR 25597400.
