= House of Representatives (Jordan) =

Lower house of the Parliament of Jordan

House of Representatives مجلس النواب
- 20th Parliament of Jordan

Type
- Type: Lower house of the Parliament of Jordan

History
- Founded: 16 April 1928 (Emirate of Transjordan); 1 January 1952 (current form)

Leadership
- Speaker: Mazed al-Qadi, Independent since 26 October 2025

Structure
- Seats: 138
- Political groups: Umma Party (31); National Charter Party (21); Eradah Party (19); Progress Party (8); Al-Islah Party (7); National Union Movement (5); Blessed Land Party (2); Jordanian Labor Party (2); Growth Party (1); Jordanian Civil Democratic Party (1); Labor Party (1); Youth Party (1); Independent (39)
- Length of term: 4 years

Elections
- Voting system: Open list proportional representation (18 seats reserved for women, 7 for Christians, and 2 for Chechens and Circassians)
- Last election: 10 September 2024
- Next election: 2028

Meeting place
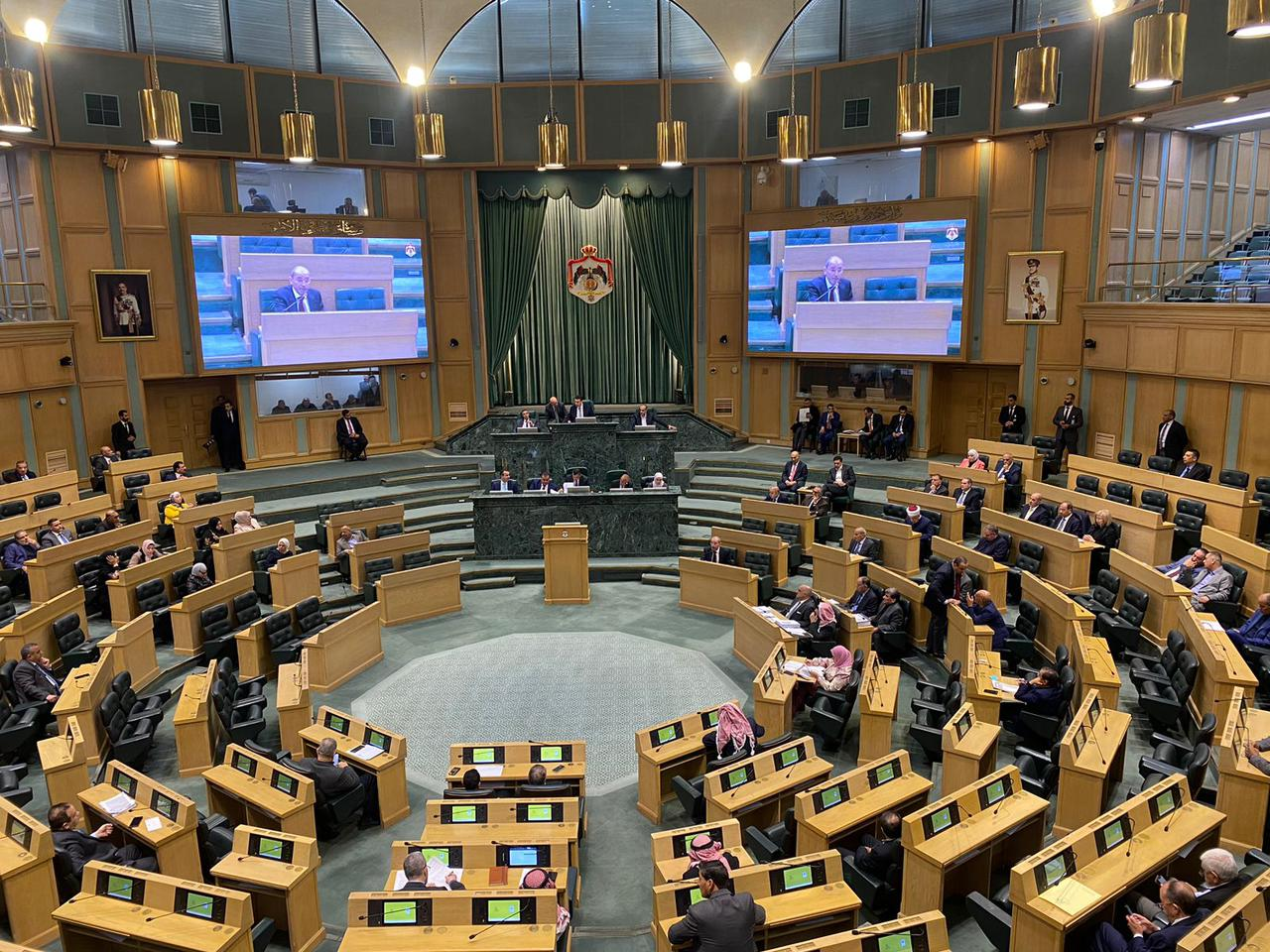
- Chamber of the House of Representatives; Jordanian Parliament Building; Al-Abdali, Amman

Website
- representatives.jo (English)

Constitution
- Constitution of Jordan

The House of Representatives of Jordan (Arabic: مجلس النواب, romanized: majlis an-nuwāb) is the elected lower house of the Jordanian parliament which, along with the Senate, composes the legislature of Jordan. It consists of 138 elected members, serving for four-year terms.

Members are elected by a mixed electoral system, allowing two votes for each person, one vote for individuals running in 18 local districts, and another for a national party-list system. Out of the 138 seats of the House, 97 are for representatives from local districts, while 41 are for party-list representatives. There are also quotas for specific demographics, including 12 for Christian, Circassian, and Chechen minorities, as well as 18 seats reserved for women. The presiding officer is the Speaker of the House of Representatives.

== History ==
Following Jordanian independence, the number of elected parliamentary councils increased to 18, with the first House of Representatives elected on 21 October 1947. During the first legislature, the most significant policy was the unification of two major banks in the country following defeat in the 1948 Palestine war. The legislature also expanded to 40 seats after including districts from the Jordanian West Bank.

Traditionally, the Jordanian House of Representatives ran under a nonpartisan system, with an overwhelming majority of representatives being nonpartisan. However, since the 2024 Jordanian general election, the parliament has developed a party system for the first time.

== Functions ==
A member of parliament (deputy) is considered a representative of the citizens before the government of Jordan as a link between the citizen and the government, speaking on their behalf and receiving their concerns or requests so that the government can then implement them and communicate with them. The House of Representatives is entrusted with two basic functions: legislation and oversight.

=== Legislation ===
A proposal with the support of ten or more representatives may become a draft law, and the House is responsible for discussing and studying it. The House will also review draft laws from the Jordanian government, and it may either accept and send it to committee, or it may reject and send it to the Senate. If the draft was sent to committee, the committee would study it and make amendments and then send it to the House floor for a vote. If the vote passes, the draft is then sent to the Senate and government for approval.

=== Oversight ===
In addition to lawmaking, the House is also responsible for monitoring the executive branch to ensure checks and balances. According to the internal regulations of the House, the chamber has several oversight mechanisms, defined as follows:

1. Questions: A House member may submit an inquiry towards the prime minister or cabinet members about a subject matter, and may include questions about intentions behind governmental decisions. The recipient of these questions must respond within fourteen days.
2. Interpellations: It is the accountability of ministers or one of them for an action he took in a matter of public affairs. The minister must answer the interpellation within a period not exceeding 21 days unless the president sees that the situation is urgent and the minister agrees to shorten the period. If the interpellant is not convinced by the minister’s response, he has the right to put a vote of confidence in the ministry or the minister, taking into account the provisions of Article (54) of the Constitution.
3. General debate: It is an exchange of opinion and advice between the Council and the government on any subject that concerns public and political issues, and those requesting the debate have the right to raise a vote of confidence in the government, taking into account the provisions of Article (54) of the Constitution.
4. Motions: A House member may submit a motion to the House speaker calling on the government to perform a particular work, and the speaker should then send it to committee for study. If the motion passes committee and the House, the speaker should then notify the prime minister.
5. Proposal of Law: The article (70) of the House’s By-Laws undertakes the proposal of law in which ten Members or more may propose laws and every proposal shall be submitted accompanied by necessitating reasons to the competent committee in the House for opinion, and after listening to the committee opinion, Should the House contends acceptance of the proposal, the House shall submit it to the Government to put it in a form of Draft Law and presenting it to the House in the same session or in the next session.
6. Petitions / Complaints: Every Jordanian has the right to submit a petition or complaint to a House representative, and the House speaker should then refer them to the executive bureau for study.
7. "Any Other Business": This gives House members the right to direct questions to the Prime Minister or cabinet ministers during oversight sessions.

== Composition ==
Prog. / Eradah / Nat'l Charter / Nat'l Union / Nat'l Islamic / Islamic Action / Others / Indep.
2024	8 / 19 / 21 / 5 / 7 / 31 / 39 / 8

== See also ==
- Category:Members of the House of Representatives (Jordan)
