= Umma Party (Jordan) =

Umma Party حزب الأمة
- Leader: Hamza Mansour; Hamam Saeed
- Founded: 8 December 1992
- Headquarters: Amman
- Ideology: Islamism
- Religion: Sunni Islam
- International affiliation: Muslim Brotherhood (until 2025)
- Colours: Green
- Chamber of Deputies: 31 / 138
- Senate: 0 / 65

Website
- jabha-jo.com

The Umma Party (Arabic: حزب الأمة, romanized: Hizb Al-Umma) is an Islamist political party in Jordan.

Founded originally as the Islamic Action Front Party in 1992 with 350 members, as the political wing of the Muslim Brotherhood in Jordan.

In early 2025, Jordan banned and outlawed the Muslim Brotherhood due to members' links to a violent plot. The IAF's offices were searched and documents confiscated, but the party itself was not banned. In 2026, the party changed its name to the Umma Party.

== History ==
The IAF's support base is composed largely of Jordanians of Palestinian descent, and represents one of the major opposition movements in the country. The IAF has taken an oppositional role towards Jordanian-Israeli relations. In 1997, three years after Jordan's peace accord with Israel, IAF boycotted Parliamentary elections, citing manipulation by the government.

At the legislative elections, 17 June 2003, the party won 20 out of 84 seats. All other seats were won by non-partisans. The National Democratic Block did not win any seats.

During the August 2007 municipal elections, IAF withdrew their 25 candidates up for election, accusing 'the authorities of manipulating votes cast by military personnel who were taking part in municipal elections for the first time.

The voter turnout for the election was a record-low 51%, but IAF still won four contests, including two mayoral races.

Four months later, the IAF fielded 22 candidates for the Jordanian national elections held on November 20, 2007. Of its 22 candidates, only six won parliamentary seats in the elections, marking the lowest showing of the Islamist party since the resumption of parliamentary life in Jordan in 1989.

The IAF attributed its loss to the government overlooking illegal practices such as vote buying, the transfer of large numbers of votes, and inserting large numbers of voting cards in ballot boxes Nevertheless, a few days after the election, the Muslim Brotherhood (the social organization that informs the IAF's platform and whose political branch the IAF is considered to be) dissolved its Shura Council and started preparing for internal elections to take place within six months.

In 2009, the deputy secretary of the party declared that the Pope was not welcome in the kingdom after plans were announced for Pope Benedict XVI to visit the country.

In 2012, Rohile Gharaibeh, a former senior IAF official, established the Zamzam Initiative, an organization with the stated goal of ending the Brotherhood's "monopoly on Islamic discourse" and promoting a more inclusive, indigenous Islam that does not "alienate the public." However, the Brotherhood's Shura Council responded by prohibiting members from interacting with the new group." In 2015, the IAF was split between reformists and nonreformists, resulting in the party terminating the membership of seven members: Abdul Majeed Thneibat, Qassem Taamneh, Mamdouh Muheisen, Khalil Askar, Ali Tarawneh, Jaber Abul Hija and Mohammad Qaramseh. As a result, they formed the new Muslim Brotherhood Society, who will join the National Initiative for Building.

In December 2015, around 400 members resigned from the IAF, including Hamzeh Mansour, a former Secretary-General of the organisation.

=== Reaction to the Gaza war ===
After the October 7 attacks and the Israeli invasion of the Gaza Strip, the Islamic Action Front swelled in popularity due to opposition to the monarchy's refusal to condemn Israel. In the 2024 Jordanian general election they saw their best results ever, winning 31 seats and becoming the single largest political party in the country. However, they would fail to form a government as the king refused to appoint their leader, Murad al-Adaileh as prime minister, instead appointing the Independent Jafar Hassan. During the election the party claimed that its members and supporters where routinely harassed by the king's security service.

On 23 April 2025, the Muslim Brotherhood in Jordan was banned and outlawed after members of the group were found to be linked to a sabotage plot. Jordanian interior minister Mazen Al-Farrayeh said all the activities of the group would be banned and anyone promoting its ideology would be held accountable by law. The IAF's offices were searched and documents confiscated, but the party was not banned.

=== Name change ===
On 26 April 2026, Jordan's Independent Electoral Commission approved the party changing its name into the Umma Party. The name change came after the commission had notified the party on 17 January 2026 that its decades-old name was in violation of the 2022 Parties Law's fifth article, which prohibits establishing parties on a religious basis.

== Ideology ==
The Islamic Action Front has been somewhat less radical than some Islamist parties in other Middle Eastern countries since 2015. The party condemns violence and terrorism. MP Dima Tahboub has expressed support for what she sees as the Palestinian right to self-defense from "Israeli aggression".

Ibrahim Zeid Keilani, a former Minister of Awqaf and Islamic Affairs, served for a long time as the head of the Sharia Ulema Committee of the party.

Within the IAF Abu Zant called himself the leader of the most radical section of the party. He had a sizeable group of followers.

== Electoral results ==
=== Jordanian Parliament ===
House of Representatives
| Election | Votes | % | Seats | +/– | Position | Outcome | Leader |
| 1993 | | | 17 / 80 | ▼5 | 1st | Opposition | |
| 1997 | Boycotted | | 0 / 80 | ▼17 | | | |
| 2003 | 139,229 | 10.4 | 16 / 110 | ▲16 | 1st | Opposition | |
| 2007 | | | 6 / 110 | ▼10 | 1st | Opposition | |
| 2010 | Boycotted | | 0 / 110 | ▼6 | | | |
| 2013 | Boycotted | | 0 / 150 | – | | | |
| 2016 | Part of National Coalition for Reform | | 10 / 130 | ▲10 | 1st | Opposition | |
| 2020 | Part of National Coalition for Reform | | 5 / 130 | ▼5 | 1st | Opposition | |
| 2024 | 464,350 | 33.69% | 31 / 138 | ▲26 | 1st | Opposition | |

== See also ==
- List of Islamic political parties
- List of political parties in Jordan
