= National Union Movement (Jordan) =

National Union Movement تيار الاتحاد الوطني
- Secretary General: Muhammad Shaheen.
- Founded: 2024
- Ideology: Economic liberalism Constitutionalism; Anti-corruption
- Political position: Center-right
- Colours: Purple; Cyan
- House of Representatives: 5 / 138

Website
- itehadwatani.com

The National Union Movement (Arabic: تيار الاتحاد الوطني) is a Jordanian political party.

== Ideology ==
The National Union Movement takes a liberal approach on economics, emphasizing private investment as opposed to an approach reliant on a mixed economy, and proposing employment opportunities to solve unemployment as opposed to social programs.

The party also believes in the rule of law, stating they aim for "Maintaining the constitution, activating it, and removing any obstacles, laws, legislation, regulations, or systems that conflict with these constitutional texts to enhance its basic principles and objectives," alongside "Emphasizing the rule of law and institutions to be the state that protects rights and imposes duties within the concept of justice and equality and enhances the principle of citizenship."

== See also ==
- List of political parties in Jordan
