= Chechens in Jordan =

Ethnic group in Jordan

Total population
- 30,000 (2020)

Languages
- Chechen, Jordanian Arabic

Religion
- Islam

Related ethnic groups
- Chechens, Chechens in Syria, Ingush, Kists, Bats

Chechens of Jordan are Chechens who have inhabited Jordan since the expulsion of North Caucasians in the 19th century. Chechens have played an important role in the foundation of Jordan as a modern state.

== History ==
=== Expulsion ===
In the second half of the 18th century, the Russian Empire was fighting the peoples of the Caucasus in an expansionist war, known as the Caucasian War. One of the outcomes of the war was that many native peoples of the Caucasus were forcefully expelled to the Ottoman Empire. An estimated 5,000 Chechen families were expelled to the Ottoman Empire. In March 1903, the Ottoman authorities sent the first 700 Chechen families to the region of Transjordan. The Chechen settlers chose to settle non-populated areas most suitable for agriculture and close to water sources. These settlers founded Zarqa, Jordan's second largest city.

=== Foundation of the Emirate of Transjordan ===
In October 1920, after establishing the Emirate of Transjordan, the United Kingdom mobilized a "mobile force" under the command of Captain Frederick Gerard Peake to defend the territory against both internal and external threats. The Mobile Force was based in Zarqa. 80% of its men were drawn from the local Chechen community.

== Military and political representation ==
Chechens are heavily represented in the Jordanian armed forces and intelligence apparatus since the foundation of the Emirate of Transjordan.

Chechens and Circassians are mandated 3 seats in the Jordanian house of representatives, currently two of those seats are held by Chechens.

== Organizations ==
- The largest Chechen organization in Jordan is the Chechen Charity Society, founded in 1958. The headquarters of the company is located in the city of Zarqa. The society has branches in places where significant numbers of Chechens live.
- The sports club Caucasus was founded in 1932 by Chechens from Zarqa, and has made a significant contribution to the development of football, table tennis, handball, and swimming in Jordan.
- In 1981, the Women’s Chechen Charity Society was established, the organization is active among the Chechen community and holds regular cultural and charitable events.

== Notable Chechens from Jordan ==
- Ahmad Aladdin (Yakam) — major general in the Royal Jordanian Army, and two times Hero of Jordan recipient.
- Muhammed Bashir Ismail Ash-Shishani — major general in the Jordanian Army, former minister of Agriculture, mayor of Amman and director of Military intelligence.
- Abdul-Baqi Jamo — influential person among the Chechen community in Jordan, minister of Legal and Parliamentary Affairs, and Religious Affairs of Jordan.
- Ahmad Ramzi — general in the Jordanian Armed forces, minister of Interior of Jordan. He was also a friend of king Abdullah I of Jordan.
- Abdul-Khaliq Bino — general in the Jordanian Armed forces, He was also a friend of King Hussein of Jordan.
- Mohammad Omar Shishani — football player, striker for Al-Faisaly.

== See also ==
- Minorities in Jordan
