= List of Arab nationalist parties =

Below are lists of political parties espousing Pan-Arabist and Arab Nationalist ideologies in various approaches. Arab nationalism or Arabism in its contemporary concept refers to the belief that the Arab people are one people united by language, culture, history, geography and interests, and that a single Arab state will be established to unite the Arabs within the borders drawn by colonial powers.

== Ruling as Majority ==
Country	Emblem	Name	Abbr.	Leader	Founded	Ideology	Legislature	Notes
Sahrawi Arab Democratic Republic		Polisario Front جبهة البوليساريو	POLISARIO	Brahim Ghali	10 May 1973	Sahrawi nationalism Big tent Social democracy Democratic socialism Arab nationalism Pan-Africanism	National Council: 51 / 51	Sole legal party
Yemen		General People's Congress المؤتمر الشعبي العام	GPC	Abdrabbuh Mansur Hadi (pro-Hadi faction) Sadeq Amin Abu Rass (pro-Houthi faction) Ahmed Saleh (pro-Saleh faction)	24 August 1982	Yemeni nationalism Arab nationalism Pan-Arabism Big tent	House of Representatives: 170 / 301	Majority government

== Minor Representation in Lower-House ==
Country	Emblem	Name	Abbr.	Leader	Founded	Ideology	Legislature	Notes
Algeria		National Liberation Front جبهة التحرير الوطني	NLF	Abdelkrim Benmbarek	23 October 1954	Arab nationalism Algerian nationalism Pan-Arabism Anti-imperialism Arab socialism	National Assembly: 98 / 407	Government
Algeria		Dignity Party حزب الكرامة	DP	Mohamed Eddaoui	1997	Nasserism Left-wing nationalism Democratic socialism Left-wing populism	National Assembly: 1 / 407	Opposition
Egypt	Link to image	National Progressive Unionist Rally Party حزب التجمع الوطني التقدمي الوحدوي	NPU	Sayed Abdel Aal	1977	Nasserism Left-wing nationalism Democratic socialism Left-wing populism	House of Representatives: 6 / 568	Opposition
Egypt		Arab Democratic Nasserist Party الحزب العربى الديمقراطى الناصرى	ADN	Sameh Ashour	19 April 1992	Arab nationalism Arab socialism Pan-Arabism Nasserism	House of Representatives: 0 / 568	Extra-parliamentary
Iraq		Popular Movement in Iraq الحراك الشعبي في العراق	PMI	Sheikh Mohammed Taha al-Hamdoun	2011	Sunni Arab interests Iraqi nationalism Federalism	Council of Representatives: 0 / 328	Extra-parliamentary
Israel		United Arab List لقائمة العربية الموحدة	UAL	Mansour Abbas	1996	Conservatism Israeli Arab interests Two-state solution Islamism Islamic democracy Social conservatism	Knesset: 5 / 120	Opposition
Israel		The Democratic Front for Peace and Equality الجبهة الديمقراطية للسلام والمساواة	Hadash	Ayman Odeh	15 March 1977	Communism Eco-socialism Israeli Arab interests Two-state solution Non-Zionism	Knesset: 3 / 120	Opposition
Israel		Arab Movement for Renewal الحركة العربية للتغيير	Ta'al	Ahmad Tibi	1990s	Arab nationalism Israeli Arab interests Secularism Two-state solution	Knesset: 2 / 120	Opposition
Israel		Balad Party بلد	Balad	Sami Abu Shehadeh	1995	Arab nationalism Left-wing nationalism Secularism Anti-Zionism	Knesset: 0 / 120	Extra-parliamentary
Jordan	Link to image	Islamic Centre Party حزب الوسط الاسلامي	ICP	Madalla al-Tarawneh	December 2001	Islamic democracy Arab nationalism	Chamber of Deputies: 0 / 130	Extra-parliamentary
Jordan		National Current Party حزب التيار الوطني	NCP	Saleh Rusheidat	2009	Jordanian nationalism Arab nationalism Pan-Arabism	Chamber of Deputies: 0 / 130	Extra-parliamentary
Jordan		Jordanian Arab Socialist Ba'ath Party حزب البعث العربي الاشتراكي الأردني	Ba'ath	Akram al-Homsi	1966	Neo-Ba'athism Arab nationalism Saddamism	Chamber of Deputies: 0 / 130	Extra-parliamentary
Lebanon		Progressive Socialist Party الحزب التقدمي الإشتراكي	PSP	Walid Jumblatt	1 May 1949	Social democracy Third Way Democratic socialism Arab nationalism Pan-Arabism	Parliament of Lebanon: 8 / 128	Opposition
Lebanon		Dignity Movement تيار الكرامة	ALP	Faisal Karami	1966	Arab nationalism Anti-Zionism Pan-Arabism	Parliament of Lebanon: 1 / 128	Opposition
Lebanon		Union Party حزب الإتحاد	UP	Abdul Rahim Mrad	1960	Nasserism Pan-Arabism	Parliament of Lebanon: 1 / 128	Opposition
Lebanon		National Banner Party حزب الراية الوطني	NBP	Ali Hijazi	1950	Socialism Arab nationalism	Parliament of Lebanon: 1 / 128	Opposition
Lebanon		Popular Nasserist Organization التنظيم الشعبي الناصري	PNO	Osama Saad	1973	Nasserism Arab socialism Arab nationalism Pan-Arabism Anti-Zionism Left-wing nationalism	Parliament of Lebanon: 1 / 128	Opposition
Mauritania	Link to image	Sawab حزب الصواب	Sawab	Abdel Salem Ould Horma	23 May 2004	Ba'athism Arab nationalism	Parliament of Mauritania: 1 / 176	Opposition
Mauritania		People's Progressive Alliance Alliance populaire progressiste	PPA	Messaoud Ould Boulkheir		Nasserism Social democracy	Parliament of Mauritania: 0 / 176	Extra-parliamentary
Mauritania		Socialist Democratic Unionist Party الحزب الوحدوي الاشتراكي الديمقراطي	SDU	Mahfouz Weld al-Azizi	20 September 1994	Neo-Ba'athism Arab nationalism	Parliament of Mauritania: 0 / 176	Extra-parliamentary
Morocco		Istiqlal Party	PI	Nizar Baraka	April 1937	Conservatism; Arab nationalism Monarchism	House of Representatives: 81 / 395	Opposition
Palestine	Link to image	Popular Front for the Liberation of Palestine الجبهة الشعبية لتحرير فلسطين	PFLP	Ahmad Sa'adat	1967	Anti-Zionism Pan-Arabism Arab nationalism One-state solution	Legislative Council: 3 / 132	Opposition
Syria		Arab Socialist Union Party of Syria حزب الاتحاد الاشتراكي العربي في سورية	ASU	Safwan al-Qudsi	1973	Arab nationalism Arab socialism Nasserism Pan-Arabism Left-wing nationalism	People's Assembly: 0 / 250	Banned
Syria	Link to image	Socialist Unionist Party حزب الوحدويين الاشتراكيين	SUP	Fayiz Ismail	1962	Nasserism Arab nationalism Arab socialism	People's Assembly: 0 / 250	Banned
Syria	Link to image	National Covenant Party حزب الوحدويين الاشتراكيين	NCP	Fayiz Ismail	1972	Arab nationalism Arab socialism Islamic socialism	People's Assembly: 0 / 250	Banned
Syria		Arab Democratic Union Party حزب الاتحاد العربي الديمقراطي	ADU	Iyad Ghassan Osman		Arab nationalism Nasserism	People's Assembly: 0 / 250	Banned
Tunisia		Democratic Current التيار الديمقراطي	DC	Ghazi Chaouachi	30 May 2013	Social democracy Third Way Nationalism Progressivism Pan-Arabism	Assembly: 0 / 161	Extra-parliamentary
Tunisia	Link to image	People's Movement حركة الشعب	PM	Zouhair Maghzaoui	2005	Secularism Democratic socialism Nasserism Arab nationalism	Assembly: 12 / 161	Opposition
Tunisia		Popular Front الجبهة الشعبية	PF	Hamma Hammami	7 October 2012	Socialism Secularism Arab nationalism Pan-Arabism	Assembly: 0 / 161	Extra-parliamentary
Yemen		Yemeni Socialist Party الحزب الاشتراكي اليمني	YSP	Abdulraham Al-Saqqaf	13 October 1978	Social democracy Arab nationalism	House of Representatives: 8 / 301	Opposition
Yemen		Nasserist Unionist People's Organisation التنظيم الوحدوي الشعبي الناصري	NUP	Abdulmalik Al-Mekhlafi	25 December 1965	Nasserism Yemeni unionism	House of Representatives: 3 / 301	Opposition
Yemen		Arab Socialist Ba'ath Party – Yemen Region حزب البعث العربي الاشتراكي - قطر اليمن	ASBP–YR	Mohammed Al-Zubairy	1951	Ba'athism Arab socialism	House of Representatives: 1 / 301	Opposition

== Formerly ruling as Majority ==
Country	Emblem	Name	Abbr.	Leader	Founded	Dissolved	Ideology	Legislature	Notes
Egypt		Arab Socialist Union الاتحاد الاشتراكي العربي	ASU	Gamal Abdel Nasser (first) Anwar Sadat (last)	1962	2 October 1978	Pan-Arabism Arab nationalism Arab socialism Secularism Nasserism Left-wing populism	House of Representatives: (Note: Three factions of the ASU: Arab Socialist Organisation: 295 members.; Liberal Socialist Organisation: 15 members.; National Progressive Unionist Rally Organisation: 3 members.) 313 / 360	Sole legal party
Egypt	Link to image	National Democratic Party الحزب الوطني الديمقراطي	NDP	Anwar Sadat (first) Talaat Sadat (last)	2 October 1978	16 April 2011	Populism Egyptian nationalism Secularism	People's Assembly: 424 / 518	Supermajority government
Iraq		Arab Socialist Ba'ath Party – Iraq Region حزب البعث العربي الاشتراكي في العراق	ASBP–IR	Saddam Hussein	Late 1940s or early 1950s	16 May 2003	Iraqi nationalism Ba'athism Saddamism Authoritarianism Militarism Anti-Americanism Anti-Zionism	National Assembly: 165 / 250	Sole legal party
Iraq		Arab Socialist Union الاتحاد الاشتراكي العربي	ASU	Fuad ar-Rikabi	1964	1968	Arab nationalism Arab socialism Pan-Arabism Nasserism Anti-imperialism Republicanism	—N/a	Sole legal party
Libya		Arab Socialist Union الاتحاد الاشتراكي العربي	ASU	Muammar Gaddafi	11 June 1971	3 March 1977	Arab nationalism Arab socialism Pan-Arabism Nasserism	—N/a	Sole legal party
South Yemen		Yemeni Socialist Party الحزب الاشتراكي اليمني	YSP	Abdulraham Al-Saqqaf	13 October 1978	—N/a	Arab nationalism Communism Marxism–Leninism	Supreme People's Council: 71 / 111	Sole legal party
Sudan		National Congress Party حزب المؤتمر الوطني	NCP	Omar al-Bashir	1998	29 November 2019	Arab–Islamic nationalism Salafism Social conservatism Authoritarianism Militarism Right-wing populism Anti-Americanism Anti-Zionism	National Assembly: 323 / 426	Supermajority government
Sudan		Sudanese Socialist Union الاتحاد الاشتراكي السوداني	SSU	Gaafar Nimeiry	25 May 1971	6 April 1985	Arab nationalism Arab socialism Anti-communism Authoritarianism Militarism Nasserism	National Assembly: 138 / 151	Sole legal party
Syria		Arab Socialist Ba'ath Party – Syria Region حزب البعث العربي الاشتراكي – قطر سوريا	ASBP–SR	Bashar al-Assad	7 April 1947	29 January 2025	Syrian nationalism Ba'athism Assadism Authoritarianism Militarism Anti-Americanism Anti-Zionism	People's Assembly: 169 / 250	Supermajority government
United Arab Republic		National Union الاتحاد الوطني	NU	Anwar Sadat (first) Kamal el-Din Hussein (last)	28 May 1957	1962	Arab nationalism Arab socialism Pan-Arabism Anti-Zionism Anti-communism Anti-Ikhwanism Republicanism	National Assembly: (Note: The Provisional Constitution of the United Arab Republic proclaiming a 600-member National Assembly with: 400 members from Egypt.; 200 members from Syria.) 600 / 600	Sole legal party

== No representation in Lower-House ==
=== Nasserist ===
Egypt – Dignity Party (Egypt), Egyptian Popular Current

Europe – Arab European League

Iraq – Arab Struggle Party, Nasserist Socialist Vanguard Party,

Lebanon – Al-Mourabitoun, Nasserist Unionists Movement, Arab Movement Party, Union of Working People's Forces, Toilers League, Lebanese Arab Movement

Palestine – Arab Palestine Organization, Action Organization for the Liberation of Palestine

Syria – Democratic Arab Socialist Union

Yemen – Democratic Nasserist Party, Nasserist Reform Organization

=== Arab Nationalism ===
Bahrain – National Justice Movement, Progressive Democratic Tribune

Egypt – Arab Unification Party, Arab Party for Justice and Equality, Arab Unification Party, Egyptian Arab Union Party, Free Republican Party, National Conciliation Party, United Nasserist Party, Arabic Popular Movement, Arabism Egypt Party

Iran – Islamic Reconciliation Party

Israel – Arab Democratic Party, Arab National Party

Jordan – Jordanian Arab Party

Kuwait – Kuwait Democratic Forum

Lebanon – Arab Democratic Party, Democratic Left Movement, Najjadeh Party, People's Movement, Lebanese Arab Struggle Movement, Arab Unification Party

Palestine – Palestinian Arab Front, Palestinian Liberation Front

Tunisia – Popular Unity Party, Unionist Democratic Union

=== Arab Socialism ===
Bahrain – National Democratic Action Society, Popular Front for the Liberation of Bahrain, Popular Front for the Liberation of the Occupied Arabian Gulf

Egypt – Egypt Arab Socialist Party

Iraq – Arab Revolutionary Workers Party

Israel – Da'am Workers Party

Jordan – Jordanian Democratic Popular Unity Party

Lebanon – Arab Socialist Action Party, Lebanese Social Democratic Party, Progressive Arab Front, Socialist Lebanon, Communist Action Organization in Lebanon, Arab Socialist Union

Sudan – Islamic Socialist Party

Syria – Social Democratic Unionists

Tunisia – Democratic Patriots' Unified Party, Workers' Party

=== Ba'athism ===
Algeria – Arab Socialist Ba'ath Party of Algeria

Bahrain – Nationalist Democratic Assembly

Iraq – Arab Socialist Ba'ath, Al-Awda

Jordan – Arab Ba'ath Progressive Party, Jordanian Arab Socialist Ba'ath Party

Kuwait – Arab Socialist Ba'ath Party – Kuwait Region

Lebanon – Socialist Arab Lebanon Vanguard Party, Arab Socialist Ba'ath Party – Lebanon Region

Libya – Libyan Arab Socialist Ba'ath Party

Mauritania – National Vanguard Party

Palestine – Arab Liberation Front, As-Sa'iqa

Sudan – Arab Socialist Ba'ath Party, Arab Socialist Ba'ath Party, Sudanese Ba'ath Party

Sahrawi Arab Democratic Republic – Sahrawi Socialist Baath Party

Syria – Democratic Socialist Arab Ba'ath Party, Arab Socialist Ba'ath

Tunisia – Party of the Democratic Arab Vanguard

Yemen – Arab Socialist Ba'ath Party, National Arab Socialist Ba'ath Party

== Defunct or Banned ==
=== Nasserist ===
Egypt – Nasserist People's Congress Party, Senior Nasserist Conference

Lebanon – Progressive Arab Front, Union of Working People's Forces-Corrective Movement, United Nasserite Organization

Libya – Arab Socialist Union (Libya)

Saudi Arabia – Arabian Peninsula People's Union

=== Arab Nationalism ===
Egypt – Syrian Unity Party

Europe – Andalusian Liberation

Iraq – Al-Muthanna Club, Arab Unity Party, Party of National Brotherhood, Reconciliation and Liberation Bloc

Israel – Agriculture and Development, Arab List for Bedouin and Villagers, Cooperation and Brotherhood

Palestine – Arab People's Movement, National Bloc, Palestine Arab Party, Reform Party

Ottoman Empire – Al-ʽAhd (Iraq), Al-Fatat

Syria – Arab National Party, League of Nationalist Action, National Party

Tunisia – Destour

Yemen – Free Yemeni Movement, National Liberation Front

=== Arab Socialism ===
Egypt – Young Egypt Party

Iraq – Arab Struggle Party, Arabic Toilers' Movement

Jordan – Jordanian Revolutionary People's Party, National Socialist Party

Lebanon – Organization of Lebanese Socialists

Mauritania – Mauritanian National Renaissance Party

Oman – Dhofar Liberation Front, Popular Front for the Liberation of Oman

Palestine – Youth Congress Party, Palestine Popular Liberation Organization

Saudi Arabia – Arab Socialist Action Party

Yemen – Revolutionary Democratic Party

Zanzibar – Umma Party

=== Ba'athism ===
Oman – National Democratic Front for the Liberation of Oman and the Arabian Gulf

Yemen – People's Vanguard Party
