= 2020 Jordanian general election =

← 2016	10 November 2020	2024 →

All 130 seats in the House of Representatives 65 seats needed for a majority
- Turnout: 29.90%

General elections were held in Jordan on 10 November 2020 to elect the members of the nineteenth House of Representatives. Voter turnout was just 30%, the lowest in a decade.

The elections took place as the country was experiencing a surge in COVID-19 cases. As a result there were numerous calls on social media channels to boycott the elections, particularly as no alternatives to in-person voting were offered. The country went into a four-day total lockdown following elections, starting at 23:00 on election day, an hour later than the originally-stated 22:00. According to the Washington Post, "wealthy business executives and tribal independents dominated, while strong, reform-oriented members of parliament lost their seats."

== Electoral system ==
The 130 seats in the House of Representatives consist of 115 members elected by open list proportional representation from 23 constituencies of between three and nine seats in size and 15 seats reserved for women. Nine of the 115 proportional representation seats are reserved for the Christian minority, with another three reserved for the Chechen and Circassian minorities.

There were 15 seats reserved for women who received the most votes but failed to be elected on their list in each of the twelve governorates and the three Badia districts.

Distribution of seats
District	General	Circassians/ Chechens	Christians	Women	Total
Ajloun	3		1	1	5
Amman 1	5			1	6
Amman 2	6				6
Amman 3	4	1	1		6
Amman 4	4				4
Amman 5	6	1			7
Aqaba	3			1	4
Balqa	8		2	1	11
Irbid 1	6				6
Irbid 2	4			1	5
Irbid 3	3		1		4
Irbid 4	5				5
Jerash	4			1	5
Karak	8		2	1	11
Ma'an	4			1	5
Madaba	3		1	1	5
Mafraq	4			1	5
Tafilah	4			1	5
Zarqa 1	6	1	1		8
Zarqa 2	4			1	5
Bedouins of the North	3			1	4
Bedouins of the Center	3			1	4
Bedouins of the South	3			1	4
Total	103	3	9	15	130

== Contesting parties ==
A total of 294 party lists with 1,703 candidates contested the elections, including the Islamic Action Front, an offshoot of the Muslim Brotherhood, and the "Progressive" list, a coalition of socialist and nationalist parties including the Arab Ba'ath Progressive Party, Jordanian Arab Socialist Ba'ath Party, Jordanian Communist Party, Jordanian Democratic People's Party and the Jordanian Democratic Popular Unity Party.

== Conduct ==
Polls opened at 07:00 and were supposed to close at 19:00. However the closing was extended by two hours, with the voting window totalling 14 hours. The Independent Elections Commission has denied that the time extension was due to low turnout.

== Results ==
According to the Washington Post, "wealthy business executives and tribal independents dominated, while strong, reform-oriented members of parliament lost their seats. Broader-based coalitions fared poorly. Less than 10 percent of the 130 members of the next parliament will be from political parties. The most influential opposition party, the IAF, lost almost half of its seats. No women were elected beyond the 15-seat quota allotted them, though five had done so in the last election. Only 15 percent of those elected are under 40". A total of 1,387,711 votes have been cast, corresponding to a turnout of 30%, down from 36% in 2016.

Party	Votes	%	Seats
Reform	71,443	5.33	8
Covenant	56,123	4.18	5
Justice	50,915	3.80	5
Fulfillment	39,882	2.97	6
People	39,407	2.94	3
Change	36,693	2.74	4
Homeland	30,354	2.26	1
Right	30,043	2.24	2
Dignity	28,964	2.16	6
Light	26,528	1.98	4
The Union	26,505	1.98	2
The Brave Ones	25,815	1.92	6
Cooperation	25,645	1.91	3
People of Determination	23,514	1.75	3
Banner	21,895	1.63	1
The Ambition	21,596	1.61	2
Determination	20,437	1.52	3
Accord	19,372	1.44	1
My Homeland	18,596	1.39	1
Glory	17,926	1.34	2
The Banner	17,738	1.32	1
The Charter	14,111	1.05	2
Balance	12,974	0.97	1
The Decision	12,967	0.97	3
Renaissance	12,402	0.92	1
Bright Future	12,266	0.91	1
Coming	11,558	0.86	1
Jordan Tomorrow	11,145	0.83	1
Popularity	11,012	0.82	1
Al-Rashid	10,988	0.82	2
Bravery	10,580	0.79	1
Blessing is my Home	10,579	0.79	1
Dawn	10,177	0.76	2
Knights	10,128	0.75	1
Mount Ajloun	9,402	0.70	1
National Reform	9,368	0.70	2
The Top	9,323	0.69	1
Stability	9,294	0.69	2
Jerusalem is Arab	9,275	0.69	2
Jerusalem	9,135	0.68	0
Holy Jerusalem	8,606	0.64	1
The Poor	8,342	0.62	1
Lemon	8,298	0.62	1
Renewal	8,224	0.61	1
The Elite	8,131	0.61	1
Knights of Balqa	8,113	0.60	1
Victory	8,001	0.60	1
Blessed Al-Aqsa	7,985	0.60	0
Pulse of Change	7,923	0.59	0
Thunder of the North	7,887	0.59	1
Sons of Mafraq	7,723	0.58	1
Brotherhood	7,715	0.58	2
Integration	7,652	0.57	1
Home for All	7,571	0.56	1
Together for Renewal	7,543	0.56	1
Back	7,516	0.56	0
The Job	7,429	0.55	0
Madaba	7,406	0.55	1
Goodness	7,319	0.55	1
Knights of Tomorrow	7,308	0.54	1
Jerash for All	7,292	0.54	0
Banner List	7,276	0.54	1
Honesty	7,276	0.54	0
Loyalty to the Homeland	7,245	0.54	0
Morning	7,150	0.53	1
Karak	7,138	0.53	1
Pure	7,115	0.53	0
The Flame	6,973	0.52	0
Solidarity	6,782	0.51	0
Sons of the Homeland	6,569	0.49	0
Badia Union	6,526	0.49	0
Sons of the Jordan Valley	6,328	0.47	1
Inspiration	6,281	0.47	0
The Lion	6,223	0.46	0
Glory of Balqa	6,168	0.46	1
Wall	6,099	0.45	0
Blessing	6,032	0.45	0
Young	5,718	0.43	0
Rescue	5,617	0.42	0
The Kenana	5,616	0.42	0
Zarqa Future	5,546	0.41	2
The Train	5,439	0.41	0
Future Amman	5,331	0.40	3
Irbid	5,194	0.39	0
National Unity	5,163	0.38	0
Future	4,983	0.37	1
People of Ambition	4,950	0.37	1
Progress	4,898	0.37	1
Elite	4,849	0.36	0
Success	4,814	0.36	0
Justice List	4,800	0.36	1
Both Banks	4,690	0.35	0
Youth of Accord	4,679	0.35	0
Arabism	4,463	0.33	0
Reform Bloc	4,433	0.33	0
Petra	4,277	0.32	2
Consensus	4,259	0.32	1
Lion-Prepared	3,979	0.30	0
Together	3,961	0.30	0
Belonging	3,853	0.29	0
Chivalry	3,842	0.29	1
Compatibility	3,746	0.28	0
Dhiban Brigade	3,713	0.28	0
Eye of the Homeland	3,684	0.27	0
Aqaba	3,565	0.27	0
Trust	3,559	0.27	0
Pride and Dignity	3,217	0.24	0
White	3,151	0.23	0
Milk Thread	3,100	0.23	0
Thread of Pride	3,040	0.23	0
Youth Authenticity	3,035	0.23	0
Knights of Jerusalem	2,986	0.22	0
Citizen	2,978	0.22	0
Unified	2,970	0.22	0
Reconcile Balqa	2,715	0.20	0
Homeland Shield	2,607	0.19	0
The Morning Hours	2,600	0.19	0
Achievement	2,525	0.19	0
The Knight	2,355	0.18	0
Our Future	2,300	0.17	0
Ears of Corn	2,275	0.17	0
Motherland	2,270	0.17	0
Al-Yarmuk	2,267	0.17	0
Al-Aqsa	2,009	0.15	0
The Voice of the True	1,966	0.15	0
Sons of Zarqa	1,953	0.15	0
Promise	1,757	0.13	0
Basmat Alruwishad	1,524	0.11	0
Equality	1,493	0.11	0
Shobak	1,404	0.10	0
Jordan Green	1,376	0.10	0
Shayhan	1,275	0.10	0
The New Approach	1,242	0.09	0
The Message	1,219	0.09	0
Growth	1,184	0.09	0
First	1,101	0.08	0
The Originals	989	0.07	0
Origin and Stability	908	0.07	0
Unit	896	0.07	0
National Movement	843	0.06	0
The Castle	761	0.06	0
The Call Amman	730	0.05	0
Aid	718	0.05	0
Shura	641	0.05	0
Zarqa Call	574	0.04	0
Initiative	546	0.04	0
Youth of the Future	538	0.04	0
It's Time	530	0.04	0
Progressive	504	0.04	0
Homeland Workers	476	0.04	0
National Direction	474	0.04	0
Tomorrow	462	0.03	0
Starch of change	461	0.03	0
My Dignity	450	0.03	0
Jordanian National	359	0.03	0
Divine Heroes	346	0.03	0
Yes we Can	345	0.03	0
National	319	0.02	0
Divine	319	0.02	0
The Brave Women	318	0.02	0
Youth of the Nation	285	0.02	0
People's Pulse	247	0.02	0
We Deserve	156	0.01	0
Block of Will	141	0.01	0
Dignity and Renewal	131	0.01	0
Arabic Appreciation	126	0.01	0
Nashamat Hauran	120	0.01	0
Justice and Development	60	0.00	0
Youth Ambition	29	0.00	0
Good News my Country	28	0.00	0
Total	1,341,585	100.00	130
Valid votes	1,341,585	96.68	
Invalid/blank votes	46,126	3.32	
Total votes	1,387,711	100.00	
Registered voters/turnout	4,640,643	29.90	
Source: Independent Election Commission

=== By district ===
Results by district
District	Registered	List	Votes	Seats			
District	Registered	List	Votes	General	Circassian/ Chechen	Christian	Women
Ajloun	114,980	Al-Rashid	10,988	1		1	
Ajloun	114,980	Cooperation	9,891	1			1
Ajloun	114,980	Mount Ajloun	9,402	1			
Ajloun	114,980	Right	8,349				
Ajloun	114,980	The Job	7,087				
Ajloun	114,980	Milk Thread	3,100				
Ajloun	114,980	Thread of Pride	3,040				
Ajloun	114,980	Reform	1,482				
Ajloun	114,980	The Brave Women	318				
Ajloun	114,980	Young	253				
Ajloun	114,980	Future	235				
Ajloun	114,980	Dignity and Renewal	131				
Ajloun	114,980	Renaissance	100				
Ajloun	114,980	Change	23				
Ajloun	114,980	Invalid votes	2,416				
Amman 1	322,052	National Reform	9,368	1			1
Amman 1	322,052	Right	7,693	1			
Amman 1	322,052	Knights of Tomorrow	7,308	1			
Amman 1	322,052	Reform	6,369	1			
Amman 1	322,052	Justice List	4,800	1			
Amman 1	322,052	Goodness	3,953				
Amman 1	322,052	Youth Authenticity	3,035				
Amman 1	322,052	My Homeland	1,383				
Amman 1	322,052	First	1,101				
Amman 1	322,052	National Direction	256				
Amman 1	322,052	Bravery	170				
Amman 1	322,052	Renaissance	164				
Amman 1	322,052	Jordanian National	50				
Amman 1	322,052	Invalid votes	2,102				
Amman 2	443,281	The Elite	8,131	1			
Amman 2	443,281	Integration	7,652	1			
Amman 2	443,281	Bravery	6,957	1			
Amman 2	443,281	Reform	6,500	1			
Amman 2	443,281	Dawn	5,655	1			
Amman 2	443,281	Change	5,316	1			
Amman 2	443,281	Cooperation	4,900				
Amman 2	443,281	Coming	4,559				
Amman 2	443,281	Arabism	4,463				
Amman 2	443,281	Knights of Jerusalem	2,986				
Amman 2	443,281	The New Approach	1,242				
Amman 2	443,281	Renaissance	760				
Amman 2	443,281	My Homeland	473				
Amman 2	443,281	Equality	250				
Amman 2	443,281	Jerusalem is Arab	249				
Amman 2	443,281	Knights	222				
Amman 2	443,281	The Banner	143				
Amman 2	443,281	Justice and Development	27				
Amman 2	443,281	Invalid votes	987				
Amman 3	266,126	Coming	6,999	1			
Amman 3	266,126	Future Amman	5,331	1	1	1	
Amman 3	266,126	Progress	4,898	1			
Amman 3	266,126	Reform	4,598	1			
Amman 3	266,126	Together	3,961				
Amman 3	266,126	My Homeland	1,770				
Amman 3	266,126	It's Time	530				
Amman 3	266,126	Progressive	504				
Amman 3	266,126	Tomorrow	462				
Amman 3	266,126	My Dignity	450				
Amman 3	266,126	Youth of the Nation	285				
Amman 3	266,126	Aid	262				
Amman 3	266,126	National Direction	218				
Amman 3	266,126	The Message	173				
Amman 3	266,126	We Deserve	156				
Amman 3	266,126	Equality	68				
Amman 3	266,126	Justice and Development	33				
Amman 3	266,126	Renaissance	28				
Amman 3	266,126	Invalid votes	298				
Amman 4	283,367	The Ambition	10,870	1			
Amman 4	283,367	Homeland	10,544	1			
Amman 4	283,367	Holy Jerusalem	8,606	1			
Amman 4	283,367	People	8,076	1			
Amman 4	283,367	Blessed Al-Aqsa	7,985				
Amman 4	283,367	Reform	6,379				
Amman 4	283,367	Both Banks	4,690				
Amman 4	283,367	Justice	4,506				
Amman 4	283,367	Citizen	2,978				
Amman 4	283,367	Achievement	2,525				
Amman 4	283,367	People of Determination	1,382				
Amman 4	283,367	The Call Amman	730				
Amman 4	283,367	The Brave Ones	676				
Amman 4	283,367	Initiative	546				
Amman 4	283,367	Homeland Workers	476				
Amman 4	283,367	Future	95				
Amman 4	283,367	Invalid votes	1,451				
Amman 5	414,680	Reform	9,111	1	1		
Amman 5	414,680	Banner	8,105	1			
Amman 5	414,680	Banner List	7,276	1			
Amman 5	414,680	Glory	7,150	1			
Amman 5	414,680	Morning	7,150	1			
Amman 5	414,680	Determination	7,147	1			
Amman 5	414,680	People	6,522				
Amman 5	414,680	Inspiration	6,281				
Amman 5	414,680	Homeland	4,182				
Amman 5	414,680	Promise	1,757				
Amman 5	414,680	Homeland Shield	1,278				
Amman 5	414,680	Equality	1,175				
Amman 5	414,680	The Message	899				
Amman 5	414,680	Invalid votes	2,678				
Aqaba	63,891	Consensus	4,259	1			
Aqaba	63,891	The Brave Ones	4,135	1			1
Aqaba	63,891	Chivalry	3,842	1			
Aqaba	63,891	Aqaba	3,565				
Aqaba	63,891	The Morning Hours	2,600				
Aqaba	63,891	Motherland	2,270				
Aqaba	63,891	Fulfillment	1,462				
Aqaba	63,891	Unit	896				
Aqaba	63,891	Divine	319				
Aqaba	63,891	People's Pulse	247				
Aqaba	63,891	Invalid votes	532				
Balqa	335,921	Justice	11,173	1			
Balqa	335,921	Jordan Tomorrow	11,145	1			
Balqa	335,921	Blessing is my Home	10,579	1			
Balqa	335,921	Dignity	9,703	1		1	1
Balqa	335,921	Fulfillment	8,470	1			
Balqa	335,921	Knights of Balqa	8,113	1			
Balqa	335,921	The Union	7,632	1			
Balqa	335,921	Together for Renewal	7,543	1			
Balqa	335,921	Back	7,516				
Balqa	335,921	Sons of the Homeland	6,569				
Balqa	335,921	Glory of Balqa	6,168			1	
Balqa	335,921	The Banner	6,018				
Balqa	335,921	Youth of Accord	4,679				
Balqa	335,921	Reform Bloc	4,433				
Balqa	335,921	Covenant	4,111				
Balqa	335,921	Reconcile Balqa	2,715				
Balqa	335,921	The Charter	2,008				
Balqa	335,921	Jordanian National	120				
Balqa	335,921	Invalid votes	3,154				
Irbid 1	362,347	Justice	11,119	1			
Irbid 1	362,347	Covenant	10,849	1			
Irbid 1	362,347	People	10,396	1			
Irbid 1	362,347	Cooperation	10,085	1			
Irbid 1	362,347	Light	9,138	1			
Irbid 1	362,347	Balance	7,734	1			
Irbid 1	362,347	Pure	7,115				
Irbid 1	362,347	Reform	7,061				
Irbid 1	362,347	Wall	6,099				
Irbid 1	362,347	Jerusalem	5,221				
Irbid 1	362,347	Irbid	5,194				
Irbid 1	362,347	Elite	4,849				
Irbid 1	362,347	Homeland	3,577				
Irbid 1	362,347	National Movement	843				
Irbid 1	362,347	My Homeland	587				
Irbid 1	362,347	Invalid votes	3,320				
Irbid 2	164,410	Justice	13,901	1			1
Irbid 2	164,410	Popularity	11,012	1			
Irbid 2	164,410	The Ambition	10,726	1			
Irbid 2	164,410	The Poor	8,342	1			
Irbid 2	164,410	Pulse of Change	7,923				
Irbid 2	164,410	Covenant	5,941				
Irbid 2	164,410	Rescue	5,617				
Irbid 2	164,410	The Kenana	5,616				
Irbid 2	164,410	Al-Yarmuk	2,267				
Irbid 2	164,410	Nashamat Hauran	120				
Irbid 2	164,410	Youth Ambition	29				
Irbid 2	164,410	Invalid votes	3,092				
Irbid 3	128,219	My Homeland	11,671	1			
Irbid 3	128,219	The Charter	9,094	1			
Irbid 3	128,219	Light	7,566	1		1	
Irbid 3	128,219	The Union	6,729				
Irbid 3	128,219	Change	4,281				
Irbid 3	128,219	Covenant	2,903				
Irbid 3	128,219	Our Future	2,300				
Irbid 3	128,219	Accord	2,275				
Irbid 3	128,219	Cooperation	769				
Irbid 3	128,219	Aid	456				
Irbid 3	128,219	Invalid votes	2,071				
Irbid 4	186,766	Knights	9,906	1			
Irbid 4	186,766	Fulfillment	8,903	1			
Irbid 4	186,766	The Union	8,789	1			
Irbid 4	186,766	Lemon	8,298	1			
Irbid 4	186,766	Change	7,933	1			
Irbid 4	186,766	Honesty	7,276				
Irbid 4	186,766	The Lion	6,223				
Irbid 4	186,766	Blessing	6,032				
Irbid 4	186,766	Young	5,465				
Irbid 4	186,766	The Train	5,439				
Irbid 4	186,766	Belonging	3,853				
Irbid 4	186,766	My Homeland	264				
Irbid 4	186,766	Invalid votes	3,366				
Jerash	122,493	People of Determination	13,127	1			1
Jerash	122,493	Renaissance	10,653	1			
Jerash	122,493	Change	8,635	1			
Jerash	122,493	Home for All	7,571	1			
Jerash	122,493	Jerash for All	7,292				
Jerash	122,493	Right	5,949				
Jerash	122,493	Reform	5,584				
Jerash	122,493	National Unity	1,273				
Jerash	122,493	Invalid votes	2,211				
Karak	188,801	Reform	10,625	1			1
Karak	188,801	The Banner	9,354	1			
Karak	188,801	Stability	9,294	1		1	
Karak	188,801	People of Determination	9,005	1			
Karak	188,801	Victory	8,001	1			
Karak	188,801	Karak	7,138	1			
Karak	188,801	Dignity	6,867	1		1	
Karak	188,801	Sons of the Jordan Valley	6,328	1			
Karak	188,801	Banner	6,196				
Karak	188,801	Solidarity	5,312				
Karak	188,801	Accord	4,762				
Karak	188,801	Right	3,984				
Karak	188,801	Trust	3,559				
Karak	188,801	Balance	2,690				
Karak	188,801	The Knight	2,355				
Karak	188,801	Homeland Shield	1,329				
Karak	188,801	Shayhan	1,275				
Karak	188,801	Growth	1,184				
Karak	188,801	The Castle	761				
Karak	188,801	Divine Heroes	346				
Karak	188,801	Invalid votes	2,691				
Ma'an	59,359	Covenant	5,155	1			
Ma'an	59,359	Future	4,653	1			
Ma'an	59,359	Petra	4,277	1			1
Ma'an	59,359	Dignity	4,026	1			
Ma'an	59,359	The Union	3,355				
Ma'an	59,359	Loyalty to the Homeland	2,528				
Ma'an	59,359	Light	1,883				
Ma'an	59,359	Homeland	1,590				
Ma'an	59,359	Shobak	1,404				
Ma'an	59,359	Invalid votes	926				
Madaba	119,404	Madaba	7,406	1			
Madaba	119,404	Determination	6,802	1			
Madaba	119,404	Change	6,372	1			
Madaba	119,404	Fulfillment	4,900			1	1
Madaba	119,404	National Unity	3,890				
Madaba	119,404	Dhiban Brigade	3,713				
Madaba	119,404	Pride and Dignity	3,217				
Madaba	119,404	Homeland	3,005				
Madaba	119,404	Accord	2,789				
Madaba	119,404	Reform	2,632				
Madaba	119,404	The Voice of the True	1,966				
Madaba	119,404	Solidarity	1,470				
Madaba	119,404	Success	1,165				
Madaba	119,404	Origin and Stability	908				
Madaba	119,404	My Homeland	295				
Madaba	119,404	Block of Will	141				
Madaba	119,404	Invalid votes	3,155				
Mafraq	109,688	The Brave Ones	10,343	1			
Mafraq	109,688	Jerusalem is Arab	9,026	1			1
Mafraq	109,688	Light	7,941	1			
Mafraq	109,688	Sons of Mafraq	7,723	1			
Mafraq	109,688	Homeland	7,456				
Mafraq	109,688	Dignity	2,217				
Mafraq	109,688	Change	1,370				
Mafraq	109,688	Invalid votes	3,673				
Tafilah	63,067	Covenant	4,417	1			
Tafilah	63,067	The Brave Ones	4,215	1			
Tafilah	63,067	Right	4,068	1			
Tafilah	63,067	Goodness	3,366	1			
Tafilah	63,067	White	3,151				
Tafilah	63,067	The Charter	3,009				1
Tafilah	63,067	Balance	2,550				
Tafilah	63,067	Ears of Corn	2,275				
Tafilah	63,067	The Banner	2,223				
Tafilah	63,067	Invalid votes	1,793				
Zarqa 1	506,604	People	14,413	1			
Zarqa 1	506,604	The Decision	12,967	1	1	1	
Zarqa 1	506,604	Justice	10,216	1			
Zarqa 1	506,604	The Top	9,323	1			
Zarqa 1	506,604	Reform	8,687	1			
Zarqa 1	506,604	Determination	6,488	1			
Zarqa 1	506,604	Dignity	6,151				
Zarqa 1	506,604	My Homeland	2,153				
Zarqa 1	506,604	Al-Aqsa	2,009				
Zarqa 1	506,604	Fulfillment	1,645				
Zarqa 1	506,604	Jordan Green	769				
Zarqa 1	506,604	Renaissance	697				
Zarqa 1	506,604	Shura	641				
Zarqa 1	506,604	Zarqa Call	574				
Zarqa 1	506,604	Renewal	554				
Zarqa 1	506,604	National	319				
Zarqa 1	506,604	Jordanian National	189				
Zarqa 1	506,604	The Message	147				
Zarqa 1	506,604	Arabic Appreciation	126				
Zarqa 1	506,604	Invalid votes	1,557				
Zarqa 2	148,627	Covenant	6,285	1			
Zarqa 2	148,627	Zarqa Future	5,546	1			1
Zarqa 2	148,627	Renewal	5,389	1			
Zarqa 2	148,627	People of Ambition	4,950	1			
Zarqa 2	148,627	Loyalty to the Homeland	4,717				
Zarqa 2	148,627	Jerusalem	3,914				
Zarqa 2	148,627	Eye of the Homeland	3,684				
Zarqa 2	148,627	Reform	2,415				
Zarqa 2	148,627	Sons of Zarqa	1,953				
Zarqa 2	148,627	Jordan Green	607				
Zarqa 2	148,627	The Job	342				
Zarqa 2	148,627	Good News my Country	28				
Zarqa 2	148,627	Invalid votes	1,775				
Bedouins of the North	98,026	Accord	9,546	1			
Bedouins of the North	98,026	Thunder of the North	7,887	1			
Bedouins of the North	98,026	Brotherhood	7,715	1			1
Bedouins of the North	98,026	Banner	7,594				
Bedouins of the North	98,026	The Flame	6,973				
Bedouins of the North	98,026	Badia Union	6,526				
Bedouins of the North	98,026	Lion-Prepared	3,979				
Bedouins of the North	98,026	Basmat Alruwishad	1,524				
Bedouins of the North	98,026	Covenant	1,341				
Bedouins of the North	98,026	Youth of the Future	538				
Bedouins of the North	98,026	Starch of change	461				
Bedouins of the North	98,026	Invalid votes	1,487				
Bedouins of the Middle	64,666	The Brave Ones	6,446	1			1
Bedouins of the Middle	64,666	Covenant	4,739	1			
Bedouins of the Middle	64,666	Dawn	4,522	1			
Bedouins of the Middle	64,666	Compatibility	3,746				
Bedouins of the Middle	64,666	Success	3,649				
Bedouins of the Middle	64,666	Bravery	3,453				
Bedouins of the Middle	64,666	Unified	2,970				
Bedouins of the Middle	64,666	Change	2,763				
Bedouins of the Middle	64,666	Renewal	2,281				
Bedouins of the Middle	64,666	The Originals	989				
Bedouins of the Middle	64,666	Yes we Can	345				
Bedouins of the Middle	64,666	Invalid votes	758				
Bedouins of the South	73,868	Fulfillment	14,502	1			1
Bedouins of the South	73,868	Bright Future	12,266	1			
Bedouins of the South	73,868	Glory	10,776	1			
Bedouins of the South	73,868	Covenant	10,382				
Bedouins of the South	73,868	Invalid votes	633				
