= Berbers in Mauritania =

Languages
- Berber languages (some knowledge of Arabic and French)

Religion
- Sunni Islam

Berbers in Mauritania are Mauritanian citizens of Berber descent or persons of Berber descent residing in Mauritania. Known historically as Imazighen, Berbers are the indigenous peoples of North Africa, with communities stretching from Egypt to the Atlantic coast of Mauritania, where they have lived since at least the third century CE. They are predominantly Sunni Muslim and most speak Hassaniya Arabic, a shift that resulted from centuries of Arab migration and political domination. A small number still speak Zenaga, the indigenous Berber language of the region, though it is now critically endangered.

Despite widespread adoption of Arab language and identity, Berber ancestry is embedded throughout Mauritanian society. Much of the Bīḍān ("White Moors"), including some of the warrior Hassan and the clerical Zwaya strata, have Berber origins, and Berber roots are preserved in the country's place names, tribal names, and the vocabulary of Hassaniya Arabic itself.

== History ==
=== Early settlement ===
Berber immigration into present-day Mauritania began around the third century CE, as populations moved south from the Maghreb. Before their arrival, the region was inhabited by the Bafour, an early group engaged in fishing, hunting, and pastoralism, whose descendants are believed to include the Imraguen fishermen of the Atlantic coast. As the Sahara continued to arid over subsequent centuries, migrations intensified from both the north and south, drawing Berber, Sub-Saharan African, and eventually Arab populations into the territory.

Between the eighth and tenth centuries, the major Berber groups of the western Sahara organized loosely under the Sanhadja Confederation, a decentralized political structure dominated by the Lemtuna tribe. The Confederation facilitated the great trans-Saharan caravan routes, which carried gold, ivory, salt, and cloth between North Africa and the empires of Ghana and Mali and presided over the first significant Islamization of the region through contact with Arab traders crossing the desert.

=== The Almoravid movement ===
One of the most consequential chapters in early Mauritanian Berber history is the rise of the Almoravid movement in the eleventh century. Around 1040–1041, a Sanhaja theologian named ʿAbdallah ibn Yassin established a ribāṭ, a fortified religious retreat, on an island in the Senegal River. The Zenaga Berbers of the Sanhaja were crucial to this founding. The movement's adherents, known as murābiṭūn (hence "Almoravids"), launched a campaign in 1042 to enforce a stricter form of Islamic practice across the western Sahara. They expanded in two directions simultaneously: northward through Morocco and into the Iberian Peninsula, and southward against the Ghana Empire, which they reportedly conquered around 1076, though this claim is disputed by modern historians.

The Almoravid period is significant for understanding the Berbers of Mauritania because it represents the height of their independent political power. Before Arab dominance consolidated in the seventeenth century, Berber-led movements helped shape the religious and political landscape.

=== Arab arrival and the Char Bouba War ===
Arab Muslims first entered Mauritania at the end of the seventh century, but the shift in the balance of power came with the arrival of the Banī Ḥassān, a branch of the Maʿqil Arab Bedouins, who migrated into the region from the thirteenth century onward. Over the following centuries, these Arab newcomers gradually asserted military and political dominance over the Berber populations they encountered.

The culminating event was the Char Bouba War (c. 1644–1674), a prolonged conflict in which the Hassan tribes defeated the Berber forces decisively. In its aftermath, Berber tribes were disarmed and compelled to pay the horma tributary tax to their Arab overlords. The defeat had lasting social and linguistic consequences: it broke Berber political autonomy and accelerated the replacement of Zenaga Berber by Hassaniya Arabic as the dominant spoken language of the region.

== Social structure ==
Mauritanian society developed a rigid, caste-like hierarchy in the centuries following the Char Bouba War. At the top sat the Bīḍān ("White Moors"), themselves divided into two strata:

- Hassan: The warrior class, who claimed descent from the Banī Ḥassān Arab Bedouins and monopolized political and military power. The warriors generally asserted Arab descent and largely disdained identification with Berber origins.
- Zawāyā (Zwaya): The clerical class of holy men, Quranic scholars, and scribes, known to the French as marabouts. Their name derives from the Arabic word for a place of religious study (zāwiyah). Many of the zawāyā "traced their origins to Amazigh lineages."

Beneath the Bīḍān sat the znaga, tribute-paying Berber tribes who had neither the military status of the Hassan nor the religious prestige of the Zawāyā, and below them the Haratin, the formerly enslaved Black Moor population.

The paradox at the heart of this structure is that the Zawāyā, the class most responsible for spreading Arabic literacy and Quranic learning, and thus for the cultural Arabization of Mauritania, are largely of Berber descent. Many Berber groups chose to enter the Zawāyā stratum after the Char Bouba War precisely to escape the humiliation of the horma tax paid to the Hassan. In this way, those with the deepest Berber roots became the primary agents of Arabic cultural dominance.

== Language ==
=== Zenaga ===
Zenaga (locally called znaga or azayr) is the indigenous Berber language of Mauritania and the only surviving member of the southern Berber branch. Linguists consider it the most divergent variety of Berber, and it is classified as critically endangered: most speakers are over the age of fifty, and no significant intergenerational transmission is occurring.

Morphologically, Zenaga is distinguished by its complex action noun system, in which many nouns follow a "non-a" vowel pattern, a feature rare among Berber languages.

The social history of the language explains much of its decline. Speaking Zenaga was historically associated with the low-status zenaga tributaries, those who had lost the Char Bouba War and been stripped of weapons and autonomy. To speak Berber was to announce one's subordination; to speak Arabic was to claim the social standing of the Hassan. Women have historically been the primary carriers of the language, preserving it in domestic and oral contexts even as men shifted to Arabic in public life.

Zenaga's influence persists in Hassaniya Arabic. Linguists estimate that approximately twenty percent of Hassaniya Arabic vocabulary is of Zenaga Berber origin, and contact between the two languages has produced ongoing creolized varieties in southwestern Mauritania and northern Senegal.

=== Place names (toponyms) ===
Berber serves as the foundational linguistic stratum of Mauritania, most visibly in the country's toponymy. Major locations across the country carry names of Berber origin:

- Nouakchott: from nwakshut, a term for a type of seashell found on the Atlantic coast.
- Adrar: from the Berber word for "mountain."
- Tagant: from taganat, meaning "forest."
- Atar: from adar, meaning "leg" or "foot."

=== Tribal names (anthroponyms) ===
Berber ancestry is also preserved in the anthroponymy of Mauritanian society. Several tribes classified under the Hassan warrior stratum, which claims Arab descent, bear names that are unmistakably Berber in origin. The Id aw-ʿAish is the most frequently cited example: a "warrior" tribe with a Berber name, asserting Arab identity.

== Migration and settlement ==
The geographic distribution of Berbers in Mauritania has shifted over time. The early Sanhaja Berbers occupied a broad zone stretching from the Senegal River northward through the western Saharan trade corridors, and their political influence extended across much of what is now Mauritania, western Algeria, and northern Senegal. Following the collapse of the Almoravid Empire in the twelfth century and the subsequent southward push of Arab tribes, many Berber groups were displaced. Some fled east toward the Gao region in present-day Mali; others moved further south toward the Senegal River basin.

By the time of French colonization in the early twentieth century, Zenaga-speaking Berbers occupied a corridor of southwestern Mauritania and northern Senegal, a region now corresponding roughly to the Trarza administrative region. Their lifestyle was predominantly nomadic and pastoral, concentrated in the arid zones bordering the Senegal River delta, where a thin strip of arable land offered limited agricultural opportunity.

Post-independence urbanization has accelerated these patterns. As rural Mauritanians have migrated to Nouakchott and other cities, Berber-descended communities have become further integrated into the broader Arabic-speaking Bīḍān culture. For the Zenaga-speaking minority, this has contributed to an accelerating language shift, as children raised in urban environments have little incentive or opportunity to learn a language spoken by only a small number of elderly speakers.

== See also ==
- Berbers in France
- Zenaga language
- Moors
- History of Mauritania
- Berbers in Morocco
- Almoravid dynasty
- Char Bouba War
- Bidan
- Zawāyā
