= 1993 Jordanian general election =

General elections were held in Jordan on 8 November 1993, the first in which political parties were allowed to run since 1956.

== Background ==
In October 1992 political parties were legalized in Jordan for the first time since 1956.

== Electoral system ==
The election was held using single non-transferable voting, with each voter casting one vote in multiple-member district.

== Results ==
A record number of voters participated in the elections, with over 800,000 casting votes at around 2,900 polling stations.

Independents won 60 of the 80 seats, with the Islamic Action Front emerging as the largest party, winning 17 seats. Voter turnout was 55%.

Party	Votes	%	Seats
Islamic Action Front			17
Jordanian Democratic People's Party			1
Jordanian Arab Socialist Ba'ath Party			1
Jordanian Socialist Democratic Party			1
Independents			60
Total			80
Total votes	822,295	–	
Registered voters/turnout	1,501,279	54.77	
Source: Nohlen et al.
