= Jordanian Revolutionary Movement =

- الحركة الثورية الأردنية
- Leader: Nezar al-Hindawi (founder)
- Founded: March, 1985
- Ideology: Palestinian nationalism Anti-Hashemite ideas Anti-Zionism
- Status: Almost inactive

The Jordanian Revolutionary Movement (also sometimes called Jordanian Revolutionary Movement for National Salvation or Jordanian Revolutionary Movement for National Survival) is an anti-Hashemite militant organization in Jordan founded by terrorist Nezar al-Hindawi, his brother Nasi and friend Farouk Salameh. The movement's goal was to fight Israel and overthrow King Hussein of Jordan. The group was formed with the huge assistance of Syrian intelligence services. The group mostly received support from Gaddafist Libya and Ba'athist Syria.

== History ==
The organization was formed in March 1985 (according to other sources, in 1984) in Nasi's apartment in Berlin. Syria provided a lot of assistance to Hindawi in forming the organization. After its formation, Syria supplied the movement with weapons and money. Many members of the organization also underwent military training in camps in Syria. The movement also had positive connections with Abu Nidal Organization. The organization was extremely anti-Israel and opposed to King Hussein of Jordan. Movement declared the "spilling of Jewish blood is legitimate and permissible until the end of the world."

As early as July 1985, Hindawi traveled to Libya to establish contacts with Muammar Gaddafi and secure greater funding. Libya suggested that Hindawi again seek Syrian assistance. In January 1986, Hindawi met with senior Syrian intelligence officers and began planning an attack on an El Al airliner (which later became known as the Hindawi affair). The organization has been responsible for a number of terrorist attacks (mostly in Jordan) and, as of 2013, was still said to be carrying them out. For example, the movement is responsible (according to Nasi al-Hindawi) for the bombing of the German-Arab Friendship Association building in Berlin on March 29, 1986. The aim of the attack was stated to be to gain Syria's respect and financial support. Other sources, however, noted that the organization was very small.

The attitude of other Islamist organizations towards the movement was rather negative, mainly due to nature of its leader Hindawi (Many Islamist organizations have derogatorily called Hindawi a terrorist), who did not limit himself in sexual behavior as is accepted in Islam and openly consumed a lot of alcohol. Hindawi was generally very fond of London's social life.
