= List of presidents of the National Assembly of Mauritania =

List of presidents of the National Assembly of Mauritania (French: Le Président de l’Assemblée Nationale de Mauritanie)

Below is a list of Office-holders:

Name	Entered office	Left office	References
Ahmedou Horma Banana	October 1946	October 1951	
Sidi El Mokhtar N'Diaye	May 1959	15 March 1961	
Hamoud Ould Ahmedou	1961	8 November 1962	
Souleymane Ould Cheikh Sidya	1962	14 November 1963	
Ba Ould Ne	? - 1965	1965	
Mamadou Samboly Bâ	May 1965	7 March 1966	Ba Mamadou Samba Boly
Cheikh Saad Bou Kané	7 March 1966	1968–?	
Youssouf Koïta	? - 1969	September 1971	
Da Ould Sidi Haïba	15 November 1971	1975–?	
Abdul Aziz Sali	? - 1976	10 July 1978	
Legislature dissolved	July 1978	1992	
Sheikh Sid'Ahmed Ould Baba	1992	2001	
Rachid Ould Saleh	1 November 2001	26 April 2007	
Messaoud Ould Boulkheir	27 April 2007	27 January 2014	
Mohamed Ould Boilil	29 January 2014	9 October 2018	
Cheikh Ahmed Baye	9 October 2018	19 June 2023	
Mohamed Ould Meguett	19 June 2023		
