= List of political parties in Jordan =

This article lists political parties in Jordan. Jordan has 31 officially registered political parties, but few play a real role because of lack of organization and clear political platforms.

The role of parties is significantly limited by institutional factors as well. The king is vested with somewhat broader executive power than is usually the case for a constitutional monarch, making it difficult for a party to win control of the government solely at the ballot box. Additionally, the electoral system is significantly malapportioned in favor of rural areas.

There is no clear picture on several political parties in Jordan, but sources mention the following parties.

== The parties ==
Party	Abbr.	Leader	Ideology	Political position	House seats
Jordanian Equality Party حزب مساواة الأردني; Hizb Musawah al-Urduni	-	Zuheir Shurafa	Centrism	Centre	
Jordanian Democratic People's Party حزب الشعب الديمقراطي الأردني; Hizb al-Sha'ab al-Dimuqrati al-Urduni	HASHD	Ableh Abu Albeh	Communism	Far-left	
Jordanian Model Party حزب القدوة الأردني; Hizb al-Qudwah al-Urduni	-	Iyad Najjar	Centrism	Centre	
New Path Party حزب النهج الجديد; Hizb an-Nahj aj-Jadeed	-	Fawzan Bqour	Jordanian nationalism		
National Coalition Party حزب الائتلاف الوطني; Hizb al-I'tilaf al-Watani	-	Mustafa 'Imawi	Islamic democracy		
Islamic Action Front جبهة العمل الإسلامي; Jabhat al-'Amal al-Islami	IAF	Murad Adaileh	Islamism		31 / 138
Blessed Land Party حزب الأرض المباركة; Hizb al-Ard al-Mubarakah	-	Mashhour Zreiqat	Centrism	Centre	2 / 138
Jordanian Shura Party حزب الشورى الأردني; Hizb ash-Shura al-Urduni	-	Feras Abbadi	Islamism		
National Charter Party حزب الميثاق الوطني; Hizb al-'Mithaq al-Watani	-	Mohammad Momani	Centrism	Centre	21 / 138
Jordanian Social Democratic Party الحزب الديمقراطي الاجتماعي الأردني al-Hizb ad-Dimuqrati al-Ijtima'i al-Urduni	JSDP	Salman Nuqrush	Social democracy	Centre-left	
Jordanian Democratic Unionist Party حزب الوحدويون الديمقراطي الأردني; Hizb al-Wihdawiyun ad-Dimuqrati al-Urduni	-	Rakan Abu Tareyeh	Centrism	Centre	
Eradah Party حزب إرادة; Hizb Eradeh	-	Nidal Bataineh	Centrism; Liberalism	Centre	19 / 138
National Union Movement تيار الإتحاد الوطني الأردني; Tayar al-Ittihad al-Watani al-Urduni	-	Mohammad Shaheen	Centrism; Constitutionalism	Centre	5 / 138
Jordanian al-Ghad Party حزب الغد الأردني; Hizb al-Ghad al-Urduni	-	Mohammad Abdullah	Centrism; Constitutionalism	Centre	
Jordanian Future and Life Party حزب المستقبل والحياة الأردني; Hizb al-Mustaqbal wal-Hayah al-Urduni	-	Salah Qudah	Liberalism		
Justice and Reform Party حزب العدالة والإصلاح; Hizb al-'Adaleh wal-Islah	JRP	Ghazi 'Elayyan	Conservatism; Jordanian nationalism		
Jordanian Democratic Popular Unity Party حزب الوحدة الشعبية الديمقراطي الأردني; Hizb al-Wihdah al-Sha'abiyah al-Dimuqratiyyah al-Urduni	JDPUP/Wihda	Saeed Dhiyab	Pan-Arabism; Socialism	Far-left	
Jordanian National Integration Party حزب التكامل الوطني الأردني; Hizb at-Takamul al-Watani al-Urduni	-	Fayez Basbous	Centrism	Centre	
National Constitutional Party الحزب الوطني الدستوري al-Hizb al-Watani ad-Dustouri	-	Ahmad Shunnaq	Arab nationalism		
Labor Party حزب العمال; Hizb al-Ommal	-	Rula Farra	Laborism	Centre-left	2 / 138
Jordanian Reform and Renewal Party حزب الإصلاح والتجديد الأردني; Hizb al-Islah wat-Tajdeed an-Urduni	Hassad	Mazen Riyal	Arab nationalism	Centre-left	
Nationalist Movement Party حزب الحركة القومية; Hizb al-Haraka al-Qawmiyya	Haq	Abdelrahman Kasab	Arab nationalism		
Jordanian Communist Party الحزب الشیوعی الاردني al-Hizb ash-Shuyu'i al-Urduni	JCP	Saud Qubeilat	Communism; Marxism–Leninism		
Jordanian Arab Socialist Ba'ath Party حزب البعث العربي الاشتراكي الأردني; Hizb al-Ba'aṯ al-'Arabi al-Istiraki al-’Urdunni	JASBP	Zuheir Rawashdeh	Arab nationalism Ba'athism		
National Current Party حزب التيار الوطني; Hizb at-Tayar al-Watani	NCP	Hamdi Murad	Jordanian nationalism Arab nationalism	Big tent	
Jordanian Flame Party حزب الشعلة الأردني; Hizb ash-Sho'leh al-Urduni	-	Othman Sawa'i	Centrism; Anti-corruption	Centre	
Jordanian al Ansar Party حزب الأنصار الأردني; Hizb al-Ansar al-Urduni	-	Awni Rjoub	Jordanian nationalism		
Progress Party حزب تقدُم; Hizb Taqadum	-	Khaled Bkar	Liberalism		8 / 138
Growth Party حزب نماء; Hizb Namaa'	-	Mohammad Rawashdeh	Liberalism; Jordanian nationalism		1 / 138
Jordanian Civil Democratic Party الحزب المدني الديمقراطي الأردني al-Hizb al-Madani ad-Dimuqrati al-Urduni	-	Adnan Sawa'ir	Liberalism		1 / 138
Jordanian National Loyalty Party حزب الوفاء الوطني الأردني; Hizb al-Wafa' al-Watani al-Urduni	-	Mazen Dla'een	Centrism	Centre	
Non-registered parties (as of January 2024)
Arab Ba'ath Progressive Party حزب البعث العربي التقدمي; Hizb al-Ba'aṯ al-'Arabi at-Taqadumi	-	Fuad Dabbour	Ba'athism		
Al-Resalah Party حزب الرسالة; Hizb ar-Resalah	-	Hazem Qashou	Centrism		
Rescue and Partnership Party الشراكة والانقاذ; Hizb ash-Sharaka wal-Inqath	Sharaka	Salim Falahat	Islamic democracy	Centre	
Jordanian United Front Party	-	Wasef Azar	Constitutionalism		
Freedom and Equality Party	-	Satam Abu Zaid	Economic liberalism		

Historical Parties
Party	Abbr.	Leader	Ideology	Political position
National Socialist Party الحزب الوطني الاشتراكي; Hizb al-Watani al-Ishtiraki	NSP	Suleiman Nabulsi	Arab nationalism, Socialism, Nasserism	Left-wing

Banned Parties
Party		Abbr.	Leader	Political position	Seats in the Chamber of Deputies
Hizb ut-Tahrir حزب التحرير	HT	Ata Abu Rashta	Islamic fundamentalism	Far-right	

== See also ==
- List of ruling political parties by country
- Politics of Jordan
