= Mohamed Ould Boilil =

Mauritanian politician (born 1951)

Minister of the Interior and Decentralization
- In office March 22, 2011 – February 13, 2014
- Preceded by: Mohamed Ould Maaouya
- Succeeded by: Mohamed Ould Mohamed Raree

President of the National Assembly
- In office January 29, 2014 – October 9, 2018
- Preceded by: Messaoud Ould Boulkheir
- Succeeded by: Cheikh Ahmed Baye

Personal details
- Born: December 31, 1951 (age 74) Rosso, Mauritania
- Education: National School of Administration, Nouakchott

Mohamed Ould Boilil M'BARECK is a Mauritanian politician who served as the Minister of the Interior and Decentralization from 2011 to 2014.

== Biography ==
Boilil was born in Rosso, Mauritania on December 31, 1951. He completed his primary studies at the Liberation and Pape Gueye Fall schools in Dakar, and his secondary studies at the Lycee Blaise Diagne in Dakar. In 1974, he became the general administrative attache at the National School of Administration (ENA) in Nouakchott. From 1976 to 1979, Boilil was the head of divisions at the Ministry of the Interior. Between 1979 and 1986, Boilil served as the prefect for Tidjikja, Nouadhibou, Toujounine, Guerou, Kiffa, Sélibaby, Tintane, and Boghé. From 1986 to 2005, he served as the wali mousaid, or deputy governor, of Dakhlet Nouadhibou, as the wali of Brakna, wali of Assaba, and wali of Adrar.

deputé à l'assemble national entre 2006 et 2009

From 2011 to 2014, Boilil served as the Minister of the Interior and Decentralization under the Moulaye Ould Mohamed Laghdaf government. As Minister of the Interior, Boilil did not investigate the shooting of Afro-Mauritanian protesters in 2011. He was elected president of the National Assembly in January 2014 under the Union for the Republic (UPR) ruling party.
