= Nezar al-Hindawi =

Palestinian–Jordanian terrorist

Nezar Nawwaf al-Mansur al-Hindawi
- نزار نواف منصور الهنداوي

Personal details
- Born: 1954 (age 71–72) Naharayim, Jordan
- Party: Jordanian Revolutionary Movement
- Other political affiliations: Arab Ba'ath Progressive Party; Palestine Liberation Organization
- Spouse(s): Barbara Litwiniec (before); Anne-Marie Murphy (before)
- Children: Natasha (first marriage)

Nezar Nawwaf al-Mansur al-Hindawi (Arabic: نزار نواف منصور الهنداوي) is a Palestinian Jordanian militant who is the founder of the Jordanian Revolutionary Movement and member of the Jordanian branch of the pro-Syrian Ba'ath Party. He gained international notoriety after his attempt to bomb El Al Flight 016 to Israel in 1986 through his pregnant girlfriend, Anne-Marie Murphy.

== Early life and career ==
Prior to Hindawi’s birth, his family fled from Palestine to Jordan in 1948 following the declaration of Israeli independence and Nakba. He was born in the Naharayim region of Jordan in 1954, into a wealthy and influential family, with two of Hindawi's uncles serving as members of the Jordanian government. According to some sources, he also had Libyan roots. His family was forced to flee again after the Six-Day War in 1967, when their village was destroyed by Israeli Defense Forces; he was 12 years old then. The events of Black September in Jordan three years later radicalized Hindawi and turned him against the Jordanian government. Friends and employers described him as an unstable person.

Hindawi was a writer. By the end of the 1970s, due to his vocal opposition of the ruling Hashemite monarchy, he had lost favor with the Jordanian government. In 1979, he became a journalist. Soon, he left Amman and first went to Iraq, then to Lebanon, where he published a number of articles, mostly in support of left-wing nationalism, and then to London, where his father and one of his brothers were already living. In London, Hindawi continued to publish political articles in Arabic. He is believed to have been a member of the Arab Ba'ath Progressive Party, the Jordanian branch of the pro-Syrian Ba'ath movement.

He was married to a Polish woman, Barbara Litwiniec, for six years, and they had a 4-year-old daughter Natasha. He met her on one of the English courses he took upon arriving in London. Barbara's father spoke well of Hindawi, but her mother did not share his opinion. At the same time, Hindawi ran into trouble with the Jordanian government, which was unwilling to renew his passport. He later moved temporarily with his wife to Poland, but periodically left there on business for long periods of time.

Hindawi and Litwiniec separated, though they never divorced, and Hindawi started dating a woman from Ireland, Anne-Marie Murphy, in the spring of 1985. Throughout both relationships, Hindawi regularly disappeared without warning for long periods of time.

== Participation in terrorism ==
in his youth, a few years after the Six-Day War, Hindawi joined the Palestine Liberation Organization. According to some reports, he and his brother Nasi offered their cooperation to the Syrian intelligence service. Hindawi, with Syrian support, founded the Jordanian Revolutionary Movement.

=== Hindawi Affair ===
Hindawi was allegedly recruited by Syrian intelligence in the mid-1980s. Following their instructions, he flew to Damascus in 1985, where he arrived at a military camp run by Abu Nidal for military training. In early 1986, Hindawi met with the head of Syrian intelligence and made the final decision to carry out a terrorist attack on an Israeli airliner. Colonel Haythem Sa'id was appointed as his curator; Sa’id obtained for Hindawi a fake passport (in the name Isam Sha'r), provided him money, and taught him how to make a bomb. He posed as a Land Rover parts buyer. He obtained the explosives in London; the explosives were said to have been manufactured at the Syrian embassy.

In February 1986, Hindawi received an "advance" of $12,000. He claimed that if he succeeded, he would have received $250,000 from his Syrian colleagues. However, if he had betrayed them, Syrian intelligence agents threatened to kill a significant portion of his 500 family members living in Syria. Hindawi received considerable assistance from Syrian intelligence: secret services issued him a fake Syrian passport, tried to obtain a visa for him from the British authorities, and gave him a safe house in London. For these reasons, Syria has often been accused of supporting and assisting in the terrorist attack on Flight 016 in 1986. However, Syrian President Hafez al-Assad told Jordan's King Hussein that Syrian intelligence considered Hindawi too unstable to continue cooperating with him.

Hindawi hid 1.3 kilograms of plastic explosives in Murphy's bag, which passed through several X-ray machines and was only discovered because an officer deemed the bag too heavy and checked what was inside. Murphy was deeply traumatized by this betrayal. In response to Hindawi's links with Syrian agents, United Kingdom severed all ties with Syria.

== Imprisonment and release ==
When the police started looking for him, he surrendered to them and was taken to prison. In 2009, it was concluded that Hindawi could be released due to his supposed remorse and hope that his involvement in terrorism would end. However, in January 2012, Hindawi lost his parole bid. In 2013, he was paroled after serving 26 years in prison (out of a 45-year sentence). But he was required to remain in custody pending his deportation to Jordan.

== See also ==
- Palestinian political violence
