= National Current Party =

National Current Party حزب التيار الوطني
- Abbreviation: NCP
- Leader: Salah Rsheedat
- Founded: 2009
- Headquarters: Amman, Jordan
- Ideology: Jordanian nationalism Arab nationalism Pan-Arabism
- Political position: Centre
- National affiliation: Renewal Current
- Chamber of Deputies: 0 / 130
- Senate: 0 / 65

Website
- http://tayarwatani.jo/

The National Current Party (Arabic: حزب التيار الوطني, Hizb Al-Tayar Al-Watani) is a political party established in Jordan in 2009. The current leader of the party is Salah Rsheedat.

== Election results ==
Election	Leader	Seats
2016	Salah Rsheedat	4 / 130
2020	Salah Rsheedat	0 / 130
2024	Salah Rsheedat	0 / 130
