= Al-Resalah Party =

Resalah Party حزب الرسالة
- Leader: Hazem Qashou
- Founded: 31 December 2003; 22 years ago
- Headquarters: Amman
- Ideology: Constitutionalism; Democracy; Social justice Political pluralism Nationalism

Website
- alresalah.jo

The Resalah Party (Arabic: حزب الرسالة) is a Jordanian political party. It was founded on 31 December 2003.

== Platform ==
- Setting programs aimed at serving the human needs of the homeland and enhancing the national security and progress thereof in economical, political and social fields as well as loyalty to the homeland, political pluralism, responsible freedom within the framework of democracy and social justice.
- Utilization of all means and tools provided by the constitution and law and faith in the institutionalized programs that depend on the principle of democracy in accordance with demands of reality and requirements of the foreseeable future.
- Work on the development of human recourses through upgrading the individual skills and abilities.
- Respecting the constitution and the rule of law as well as political pluralism in thought and opinion.
- Preservation of the independence of the homeland.
- Renunciation of violence and the achievement of equal opportunities for all citizens.
- Not to engage in any organizational or financial links with any non-Jordanian side.
- Refrain from partisan organization and polarization within the armed forces or the public security personnel.

== See also ==
- List of political parties in Jordan
