= Jordanian Arab Party =

Jordanian Arab Party حزب العربي الأردني
- Leader: Mazin Riyal
- Founded: 2002
- Headquarters: Amman (Jordan)
- Ideology: Arab nationalism Liberalism

The Jordanian Arab Party is a Jordanian political party. The party was founded in 2002. The general secretary of the party is Mazin Riyal.

== See also ==
- List of political parties in Jordan
