= 1997 Jordanian general election =

General elections were held in Jordan on 4 November 1997. The elections were boycotted by the main opposition parties and resulted in independents winning 75 of the 80 seats. Voter turnout was 45%.

== Results ==
Party	Votes	%	Seats	+/–
National Constitutional Party			2	New
Arab Land Party			1	New
Jordanian Democratic Popular Unity Party			1	New
Jordanian Arab Socialist Ba'ath Party			1	0
Independents			75	+15
Total			80	0
Total votes	822,318	–		
Registered voters/turnout	1,838,223	44.73		
Source: Nohlen et al.
