= Abou El-Fadhel Baadji =

Algerian politician (born 1963)

Abou El-Fadhel Baâdji
- أبو الفضل بعجي
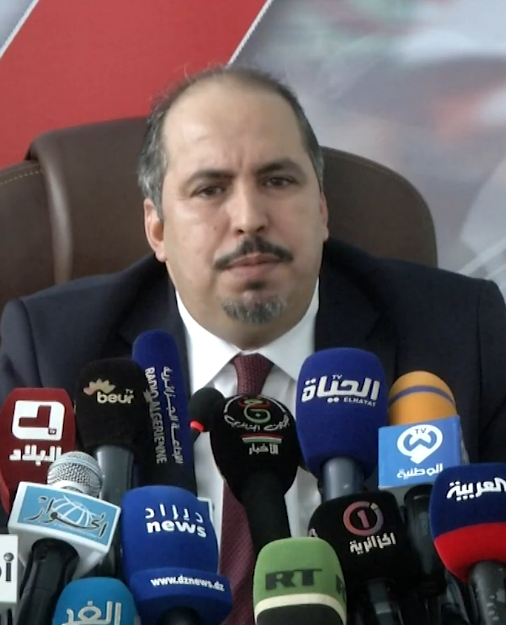
- Baadji in 2021

Secretary-General of the National Liberation Front
- In office 30 May 2020 – 23 November 2023
- Preceded by: Mohamed Djemaï
- Succeeded by: Abdelkrim Benmbarek

Personal details
- Born: 20 February 1963 (age 63) Ouled Derradj, Algeria
- Party: FLN
- Profession: Politician

Abou El-Fadhel Baâdji (Arabic: أبو الفضل بعجي; born 20 February 1963) is an Algerian politician who has served as the Secretary-General of the National Liberation Front (FLN) from 30 May 2020 to 23 November 2023, succeeding Mohamed Djemaï.

Baadji holds academic qualifications in law and political science and has been involved in the leadership of the FLN during key political events, including the 2021 Algerian parliamentary election and the 2022 Algerian Council of the Nation election. During his tenure, the FLN has maintained its position as a significant player in Algeria's political landscape.
