= Messaoud Ould Boulkheir =

Mauritanian politician

- مسعود ولد بو الخير
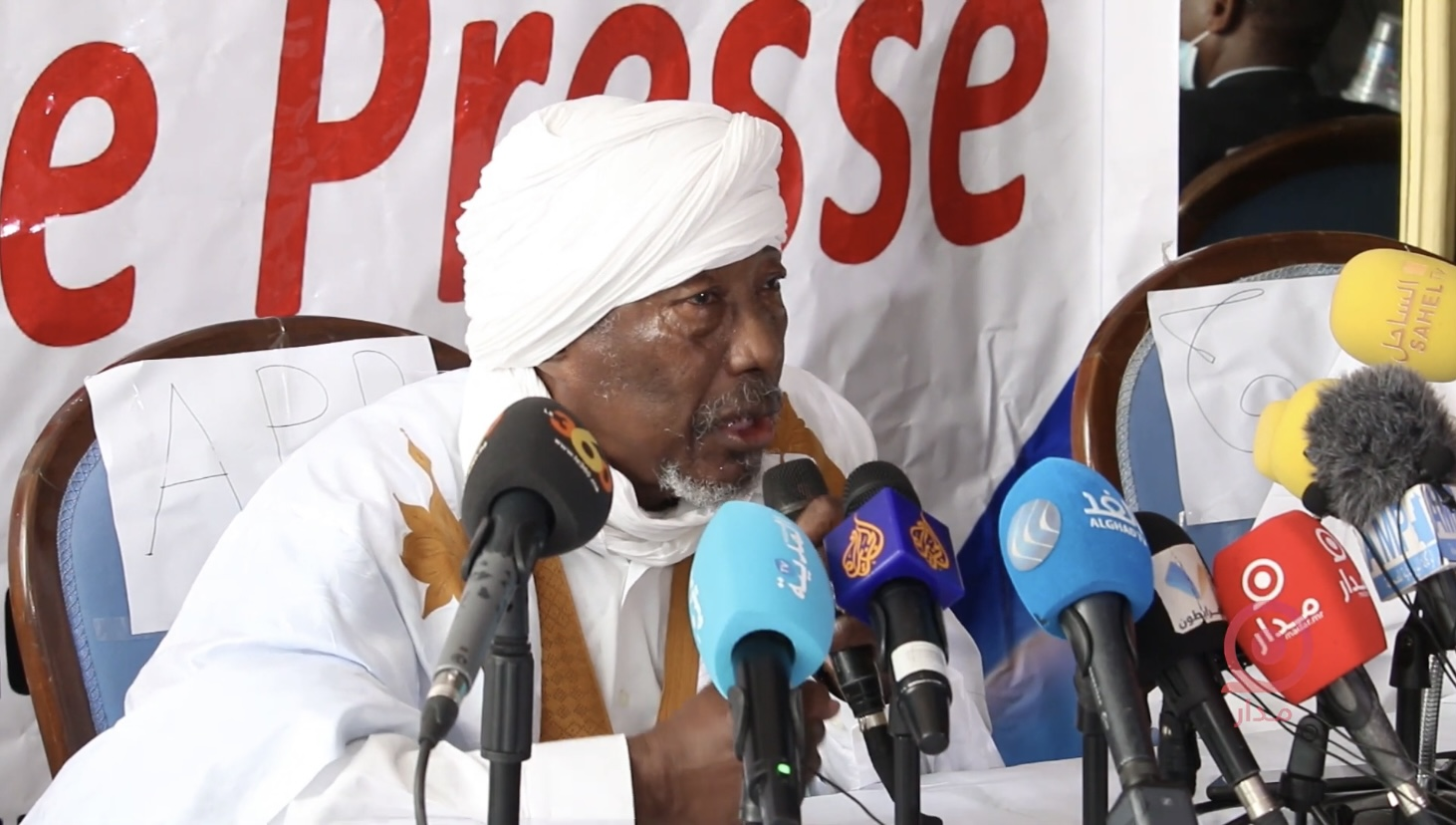
- Boulkheir in 2021

President of the National Assembly
- In office 27 April 2007 – 27 January 2014
- Preceded by: Rachid Ould Saleh
- Succeeded by: Mohamed Ould Boilil

Personal details
- Born: 1943 (age 82–83) Fara El Kitane, Colony of Mauritania, French West Africa
- Citizenship: Mauritania
- Party: People's Progressive Alliance

Messaoud Ould Boulkheir (Arabic: مسعود ولد بو الخير; born 1943) is a political figure from Mauritania and a leader in the Haratine community. Messaoud also contributed towards the end of the 1989 events in Mauritania, protecting the right of the victims and the emancipation of the Haratine in Mauritania with his party.

Boulkheir is President of the People's Progressive Alliance, and was the President of the National Assembly of Mauritania from April 2007 to January 2014.

== Family and childhood ==
=== Family history ===
Messaoud Ould Boulkheir was born in 1943; the date is unclear because at that time the birth registration service was unknown. Like most Haratine at that time, his family subsisted on agriculture, including cattle farming and picking fruit, while his father also hunted.

Messaoud's mother had taken care of the family until the older sister of her master married the Chief of the Ahel Taleb Community. Messaoud's mother thought that the queen of the community would help her. In contrast to what she thought, the queen of the community was jealous of her and was helping her cousins who ignored her when her family was in a difficult situation. One night, the queen of the community sent her cousin to the Messaoud Ould Boulkheir family tent to destroy it and to beat her mother. The queen's cousins had burned the Messaoud's tent, destroying everything, took her jewelries and beat Messaoud's mother and left her for dead. They left the place with much blood and fire.

After surviving this event, Messaoud's mother went directly with her dress covered with blood, to the French colonial administration in Nema to complain. Generally, the colonial administration does not take any part of the problems of the slaves with their masters. After the colonial administrator saw her covered with blood and harmed, they decided to help her. The colonial administration asked for the restitution and reimbursement of all of the things the master's had destroyed and taken and to freed Messaoud's mother and her family. They suggested that Messaoud's mother stay in the city of Nema to avoid this kind of attack. But she refused because she wanted to live in her community and to be respected there.

The Messaoud family became one of the first Haratine family in Mauritania to become free and to live equally in the same community as their ancient masters the Beydhan. Messaoud's mother died in October 1953.

=== Childhood years ===
Messaoud Ould Boulkheir started his primary school in 1950. At that time every family was obligated to send one of their sons or daughters to school. Messaoud was sent to a French school because the Ahel Taleb Ethmane family (the masters of the Messaoud family) did not want to send their children to school. It was an obligation to send at least one child in each family. The Ahel Taleb Ethmane family preferred to send one of their slave's sons who were Messaoud Ould Boulkheir. Messaoud's mother complained and refused, but a woman of the city, who had been to French school, advised her that it was a good idea to send him to school. Messaoud became the first of the Ahel Taleb Ethmane family to go to school. Messaoud left the community to go to the city (Nema) to study; he was living with his community correspondent in Nema who a woman from another community who was unkind to him.

After these events, Messaoud abandoned his Muslim faith until 1967 when he was 24 years old, and he resumed the practice of Islam.

Messaoud Ould Boulkheir obtained his primary studies certificate in 1956. He started his secondary studies in 1957 at the "College Xavier Coppolani" (Secondary school) in Rosso in the southwest of Mauritania. Messaoud did not study there for a long time because with the freedom of the secondary school, he was missing many classes to profit of what he did not get in his primary school. He failed his first secondary year and in 1960 he was dismissed from the school. Messaoud assumed his dismiss but he is sure that if he was a Beydhan, he would not have been dismissed.

At the same time that he was dismissed Messaoud lost his only older sister who was struck under their tent. His older sister had been taking care of the family after the death of Messaoud's parents. She left her two young daughters (three and one years old). After these events, Messaoud was alone without anybody; he realized that his only solution was to fight for his right or to perish. Messaoud is a former slave who wants to affront the Beydhan in the society; this was the most difficult thing for Messaoud. Messaoud's favorite hobbies were to read and to listen to the radio.

In 1958, he was a benevolent secretary of the "Cercle of Nema" (colonial administration). Messaoud was in charge of registering mailings and typing the non-confidential mails. In December 1959, there was a national competition to recruit secretaries of administration. However, the minimum age for the competition was eighteen years old. Messaoud participated with the help of the commandant of the colonial administration of Nema as he was not old enough.

== Early career ==
=== Administrative career and positions ===
In 1960, Messaoud Ould Boulkheir was admitted and transferred to Atar a city populated by the Beydhan in majority. In July 1960, Messaoud arrived at Atar; he met the commandant of the colonial administrator who was at that time French. A few months later, Mauritania gained its Independence from France in November 1960. The colonial administration became administrated by the Beydhan or the Black-Africans (Fulani, Soninke, and Wolof). Messaoud came under the direction of the Beydhan because they were directing the now ancient colonial administration. In 1962 he was transferred to Boghe and Aleg in the south of the country until 1968. Then, Messaoud moved to Aioun El Atrouss from 1968 to 1969. He also was transferred to Tichit in 1969 to 1970; Messaoud suffered difficulties because he was Haratine who was working in the Administrations run by the Beydhan who made things difficult for him because he was too young. From 1964 to 1965 he did an internship to promote his level to redactor of Administration, in which he was the major. Five years later he was transferred to Maghama in Gorgol, in which he was under the direction of his internship classmate who was a Beydhan. After a long fight for the right to have a good position, the Government sent him as a chief of district of Temessoumitt in the department of Moundjeria which was not very populated and was without water. After being informed of the conflict between Messaoud and his boss, the government decided to transfer him to Ouadane in Adrar in the desert. Ouadane was better than Temessoumitt because the region was more populated. In April 1975, Messaoud was contacted by the Interior Minister, to come to Nouakchott (Capital of Mauritania) for a professional formation of cities administrator in which he would be promoted to City Administrator. In Nouakchott, Messaoud heard that there was another national competition for the Public Administration Certificate that was more efficient than City administrator. Messaoud decided to do the two competitions at the same time, but he needed the permission of the interior minister. The interior minister contacted Messaoud and told him that he could not do the two competitions at the same time because he did think that Messaoud would not succeed due to the fact that Messaoud was a Haratine. Messaoud told the minister that he could do it and the minister decided that if Messaoud failed the public administration certificate he would no longer work in the government; the minister requested a signed letter from Messaoud. Messaoud agreed to the contract and knew that he was taking a huge risk. Four months later, Messaoud was the third of his promotion for the public administration certificate and the first of the professional formation for city administrator. After the results of the competition, Messaoud was promoted Assistant of the Governor of Nouakchott in charge of administrative cases. Three months later, Messaoud was promoted Executive Administrator of Rosso (in the south of Mauritania).

In 1981, Messaoud was nominated the Governor of Gorgol and Guidimakha (regions) for four years.

In 1984, Messaoud was the first Haratine who entered in the Mauritanian Government as Minister of Rural Development.

== Political parties and achievements ==
Messaoud began campaigning against slavery and for the emancipation of the Haratine in Mauritania in 1962. Messaoud met other Haratines at ENA (National School of Administration) who wished to fight for their freedom while studying for his Public Administration certificate. They formed the secret group "El HOR," which stands for group for the Emancipation of Haratine, in 1978. Because many Haratines joined the party, the formation of this party benefited the Haratines in Mauritania much. The party was protecting the right of the Haratine by creating small unit of agents in the organization who would stop the trade and the mistreating of the Haratines by the Beydhanes. EL-HOR created a "revolution" in the country which leads in 1981 to the official abolition of slavery in Mauritania. EL HOR was growing and becoming very powerful that is why in 1989 it became officially recognize, with Messaoud as leader. They were part of the municipal election in 1989. The Government created a lot of problems for the EL HOR party by arresting its leaders, that is why in 1991 Messaoud created the FUDC (United democratic forces for change). He participated in the creation of UFD (United democratic forces) in 1992 which regrouped all political leaders (Beydhan, Haratine, and Black-Africans) but Messaoud left the party because the leader was a Beydhan.

In 1995, he created his own party called AC (action for changes) which regrouped Haratine into a majority. Messaoud ended by creating the People's Progressive Alliance (APP), his current political party.

== Presidential campaign ==
Boulkheir was a candidate in the presidential election of November 7, 2003, taking the fourth place with about 5% of the vote. On November 8, together with the opposition candidates Mohamed Khouna Ould Haidalla and Ahmed Ould Daddah, he alleged "fraud" and urged the people to reject the results.

On January 20, 2007, following the ouster of President Maaouya Ould Sid'Ahmed Taya in the August 2005 military coup d'état, Boulkheir announced his candidacy in the March 2007 presidential election. In the election, held on March 11, he placed fourth, receiving 9.79% of the vote. On March 19, he backed Sidi Ould Cheikh Abdallahi for the second round, despite the fact that he was part of the Coalition of the Forces for Democratic Change along with the other second round candidate, Ahmed Ould Daddah. Abdallahi won the election, and on April 26, 2007, Boulkheir was elected as President of the National Assembly, receiving 91 votes from the 93 deputies present.

On September 2, 2007, Boulkheir said that the APP would not join a new party being formed to support Abdallahi; according to Boulkheir, this initiative would harm pluralism and be a "move back" to a single-party dominant system.

Following the August 2008 military coup d'état, in which Abdallahi was ousted, Boulkheir said on August 10, 2008, that he still recognized Abdallahi as President and rejected the military junta's plans to hold a new election. The APP took part in a four-party alliance opposing the coup, called the National Front for the Defense of Democracy (FNDD), along with Abdallahi's party, the National Pact for Democracy and Development (PNDD-ADIL).

In October 2008, Boulkheir called for a solution to the situation that would involve Abdallahi returning to the Presidency for only the limited period necessary to organize an early Presidential election. Boulkheir's proposal would also involve the formation of a government of national unity during that period.

The National Assembly opened for its first regular session since the coup on November 10, 2008 (it had previously held a special session). Remaining in opposition to the coup, which was supported by a parliamentary majority, Boulkheir boycotted the session. On April 8, 2009, Boulkheir participated in an FNDD protest in Nouakchott against the planned June 2009 presidential election, denouncing the "unilateral electoral agenda of the putschists" and warning that "neither tanks, nor guns nor live bullets can stop our fight against the usurpation of power by force".
