= Jordanian Arab Socialist Ba'ath Party =

Jordanian Arab Socialist Ba'ath Party حزب البعث العربي الاشتراكي الأردني
- Leader: Akram al-Homsi
- Founded: 1951; 75 years ago, current form: 1966; 60 years ago, legally registered in 1993; 33 years ago
- Headquarters: Amman, Jordan
- Ideology: Ba'athism; Saddamism; Arab nationalism
- International affiliation: Ba'ath Party (Iraqi-dominated faction)
- Colors: Black, Red, White and Green (Pan-Arab colors)
- House of Representatives: 0 / 130
- Senate: 0 / 65

Party flag

The Jordanian Arab Socialist Ba'ath Party (JASBP), previously known as the Arab Socialist Ba'ath Party – Jordan Region (Arabic: حزب البعث العربي الاشتراكي الأردني Ḥizb Al-Ba'aṯ Al-'Arabī Al-Ištirākī al-’Urdunni) is a political party in Jordan. It is the Jordanian regional branch of the Iraqi-led Ba'ath Party.

== History ==
Following the establishment of the Ba'ath Party in Syria in 1947, Ba'athist ideas spread throughout the Arab world. In Jordan Ba'athist thought first spread to the East Bank in the late-1940s, most notably at universities. While the regional branch was not formed before 1951, several meetings took place at the universities where students and professors alike would discuss the ideology of the newly established Ba'ath Party. Several people expressed their support for Ba'athist ideology at these meetings, but the regional branch itself was not formed until 1951 in Karak by a group of teachers. A clinic owned by Abd al-Rahman Shocair became a meeting place for Ba'athists in the organisation's early days. In the West Bank the party was most active in the cities of East Jerusalem and Ramallah. Bahjat Abu Gharbiyah was the West Bank Ba'ath member, and, because of it, was responsible for building up the party organisation in this area.

The party's first regional conference was held in 1951 at Abdullah Rimawi's home. At this meeting the party's first ideological programme was laid out, and a plan which mapped out the "future course of the party". The following year, in 1952, another meeting was held, this time in Abdullah Na'was' home. At this conference a Regional Command was elected with Rimawi as its General Secretary, while Shugyar, Gharbiyah and Na'was were elected to the Central Committee. Rimawi and Na'was would prove to be effective leaders, and their recruitment campaign proved successful in both Jordanian and Palestinian neighbourhoods and cities. The regional branch became a legalised party on 28 August 1956 by a decision of the Jordanian High Court.

Both Rimawi and Na'was were elected to Parliament during the 1950 and 1951 elections as independents (the Ba'ath Party was not a legalised party at this time). The party managed to get three ba'athists elected to Parliament in the 1951 election. However, during the 1954 election they lost all their seats. Rimawi was re-elected in the 1956 election to the Jordanian parliament, and retained his seat until the 1961 election. As voting patterns would prove, the largest concentrations of ba'athists lived in Irbid and Amman on the East Bank, and Jerusalem and Nablus on the West Bank. Shuqyar during his forced exile inside Jordan, was influenced by communist thought during his exile. When his exile ended, Shuqyar tried to form a National Front with the Jordanian Communist Party and the Ba'ath regional organisation as its leading members. However, his fellow ba'athist colleagues opposed this idea, and, because of it, Shuqyar left the party.

The party was again legally registered in 1993, but was forced to change its name to Jordanian Arab Socialist Ba'ath Party. From then on it has been led by Akram al-Homsi. Khalil Haddadeen, Jordan's former Minister of Information, was elected to Parliament during the 1993 and 1997 elections on a pro-Iraqi and pro-Saddam Hussein stance.

At the time of the 1966 split, the party had an estimated 1,000 members. It was active in the Arab Liberation Front (ALF). The ALF's first leader was Jordanian, Zayd Haydar. Munif al-Razzaz, who joined the party in 1966, eventually became an ALF leader. From there, he climbed the party ladder and became a member of the National Command before he was placed under house arrest by Iraqi authorities. Shahir Abu Shahut became the first leader of the party after the 1966 split.

=== Recent history ===
Since the establishment of the authoritarian political systems in Iraq and Syria, the popularity of the Ba'ath Party has waned, but Ba'athist ideology remains popular. The reason being that both the Iraqi and the Syrian-led Ba'ath parties have replaced ideology with blind allegiance to Saddamist discourse or the Assad regime. A Jordanese academic, talking to the American embassy in Amman, Jordan, said "there are far more real Baathists outside the party than inside", noting that the present party is downplaying (and even replacing) ideological components to get more followers.

The party was able to gain some support in the 1990s, because of its status as a Ba'ath Party branch, it was able to help finance thousands of scholarships to Iraqi universities. However, with the 2003 invasion of Iraq, the party was nearly forced into bankruptcy, and lost most of its followers when it failed to finance the return of students from Iraq. The party was denied legal registration in 1992, but was legally registered the following. However, it was forced to change its name from the "Arab Socialist Ba'ath Party" to the "Jordanian Arab Socialist Ba'ath Party" (Arabic: حزب البعث العربي الاشتراكي الاردني Hizb Al-Ba'ath Al-'Arabi Al-Ishtiraki Al-Urduniy). Khalil Haddadeen, Jordan's former minister of information, was elected to Parliament during the 1993 and 1997 elections on a pro-Iraqi, Saddamist platform. Currently, the party has no members of parliament.

In its first regional congress since the 2003 invasion of Iraq, the Regional Command alleged it would publicize an alleged letter from Saddam Hussien. However, the Jordanian press largely ignored the event. Today, in contrast to Ba'athist ideology, both the pro-Iraq and pro-Syrian parties are considered largely irrelevant in the Jordanian political scene. It is suffering from financial problems, and it is criticized by religious Jordanians for its secularism, while others are weary of its Arab nationalist ideology.

In a 1995 poll 16.8 percent of Jordanians said they were aware that the party existed, making it the third-best-known political party in Jordan (surpassing the Arab Ba'ath Progressive Party, its pro-Syrian counterpart, by over 10 percent in the poll). In May 2003, it was estimated that the party had less than 200 members.

In 2023, the Jordanian Ba'ath Party's licence to participate in the local elections was renewed, causing criticism from Iraqi figures.

== See also ==
- Arab Ba'ath Progressive Party
- List of political parties in Jordan
