= Abdelkrim Benmbarek =

Algerian educator and politician (born 1959)

Abdelkrim Benmbarek عبد الكريم بن مبارك
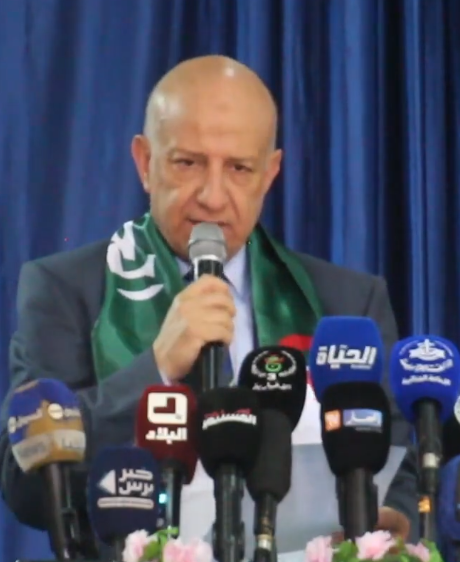
- Benmbarek in 2026

Secretary-General National Liberation Front
- Incumbent
- Assumed office 23 November 2023
- Preceded by: Abou El-Fadhel Baadji

Member of the People's Provincial Assembly of Algiers
- Incumbent
- Assumed office 27 November 2021
- Constituency: Bouzaréah

Member of the People's National Assembly
- In office 2002–2007
- Constituency: Algiers

Personal details
- Born: 1 January 1959 (age 67) Batna Province, French Algeria
- Party: National Liberation Front

Abdelkrim Benmbarek (Arabic: عبد الكريم بن مبارك, romanized: ʻAbd al-Karīm ibn Mubārak) is an Algerian politician and educator who has served as secretary-general of the National Liberation Front since 2023. He previously served as a member of the People's National Assembly from 2002 to 2007 and has been a member of the People's Provincial Assembly of Algiers since 2021. He has also held several positions within the FLN, including responsibility for the party's Bouzaréah organization in Algiers.

Benmbarek was born in 1959 in Batna Province, Algeria and worked as a teacher before retiring. He is also the author of several educational books.

Benmbarek became involved in the FLN during his student years and subsequently held various positions within the party. He was elected to the People's National Assembly for the 2002–2007 legislative term. He was subsequently elected to the People's Provincial Assembly of Algiers in 2021. Within the FLN, he served as the party's mouhafedh in Bouzaréah.

On 13 November 2023, following the FLN's 11th congress in Algiers, Benmbarek was unanimously selected by the party's Central Committee as secretary-general for a five-year term, succeeding Abou El-Fadhel Baadji.

== See also ==
- National Liberation Front (Algeria)
