= Beidane =

Ethnic group

Beidane (Arabic: بيضان, romanized: Biḍān; also spelled Bayḍān), is an Arabic term meaning 'white' used in Mauritania to refer to lighter-skinned Mauritanians, in contrast to the term Haratine, which refers to those with a darker complexion. Of mixed Arab and Berber ancestry, the Beidane represent 30% of Mauritania's population. The Beidane people’s language is Hassaniya Arabic. Al-Bidān is an endonym used within Mauritania and Western Sahara by the Bidān people to refer to themselves. The name “Beidane” refers to “Moors.” During the 20th century, colonial French authorities named present-day Mauritania after ancient Mauretania (a historical region to designate the Mediterranean coastal areas of Morocco and Algeria). Since antiquity, ancient Mauretania’s peoples (the Mauri) were known throughout the Mediterranean world as the Indigenous inhabitants the coastal Maghreb. In contemporary Mauritanian society, the Beidane people’s form a significant part of Mauritania’s total population.

"Moor" is not a term for any specific ethnic group, but rather it denotes an antiquated Christian European term (used in the West) to historically refer to peoples hailing from North Africa and West Asia (or, more generally, for Muslim Europeans who adopted Islam during the Middle Ages. For hundreds of years, Arabs and Berbers (from the Maghreb and the Levant) controlled parts of Malta, Sicily, Portugal, Spain, and France.

== Societal hierarchy ==
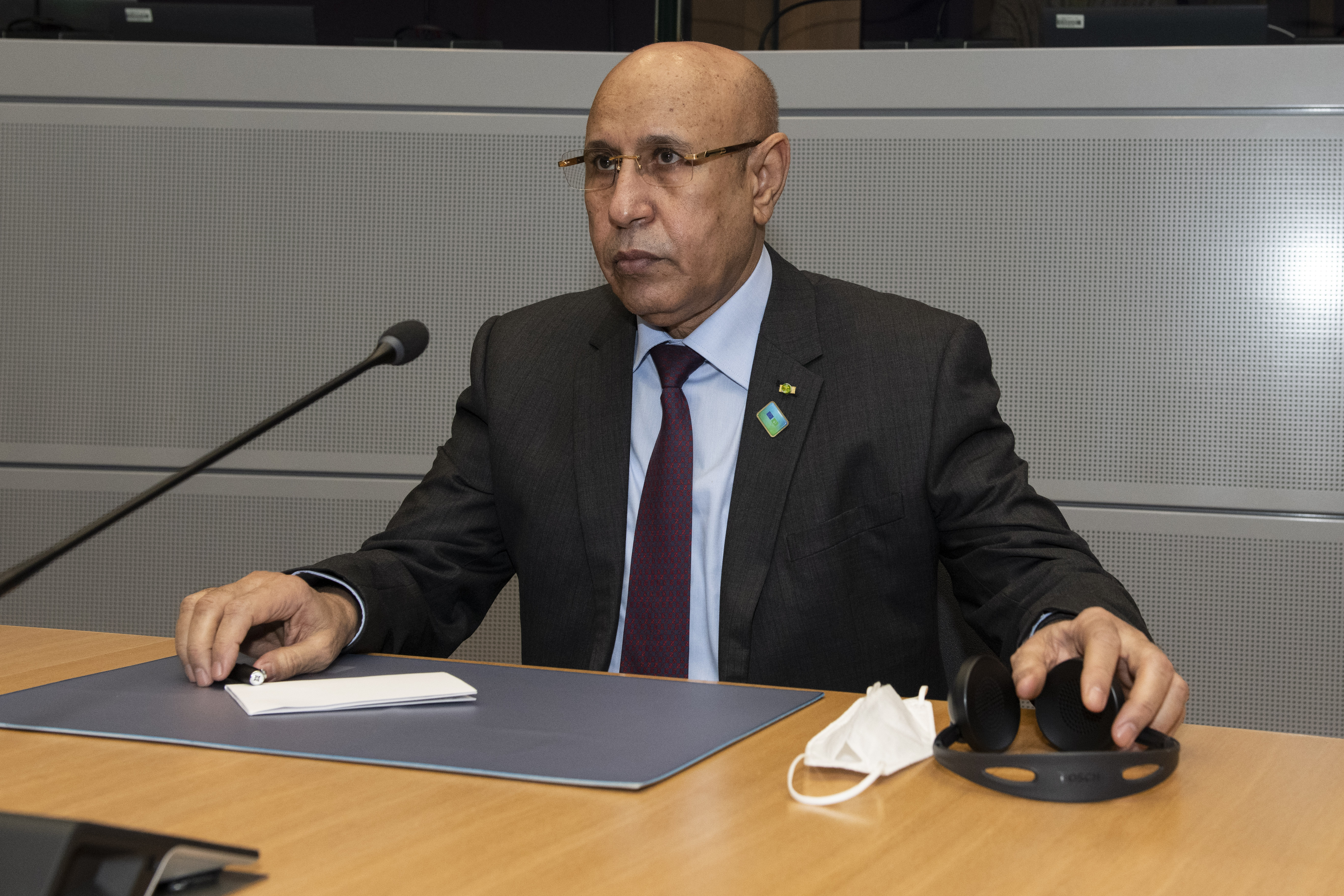
Mauritanian President Mohamed Ould Ghazouani in 2022

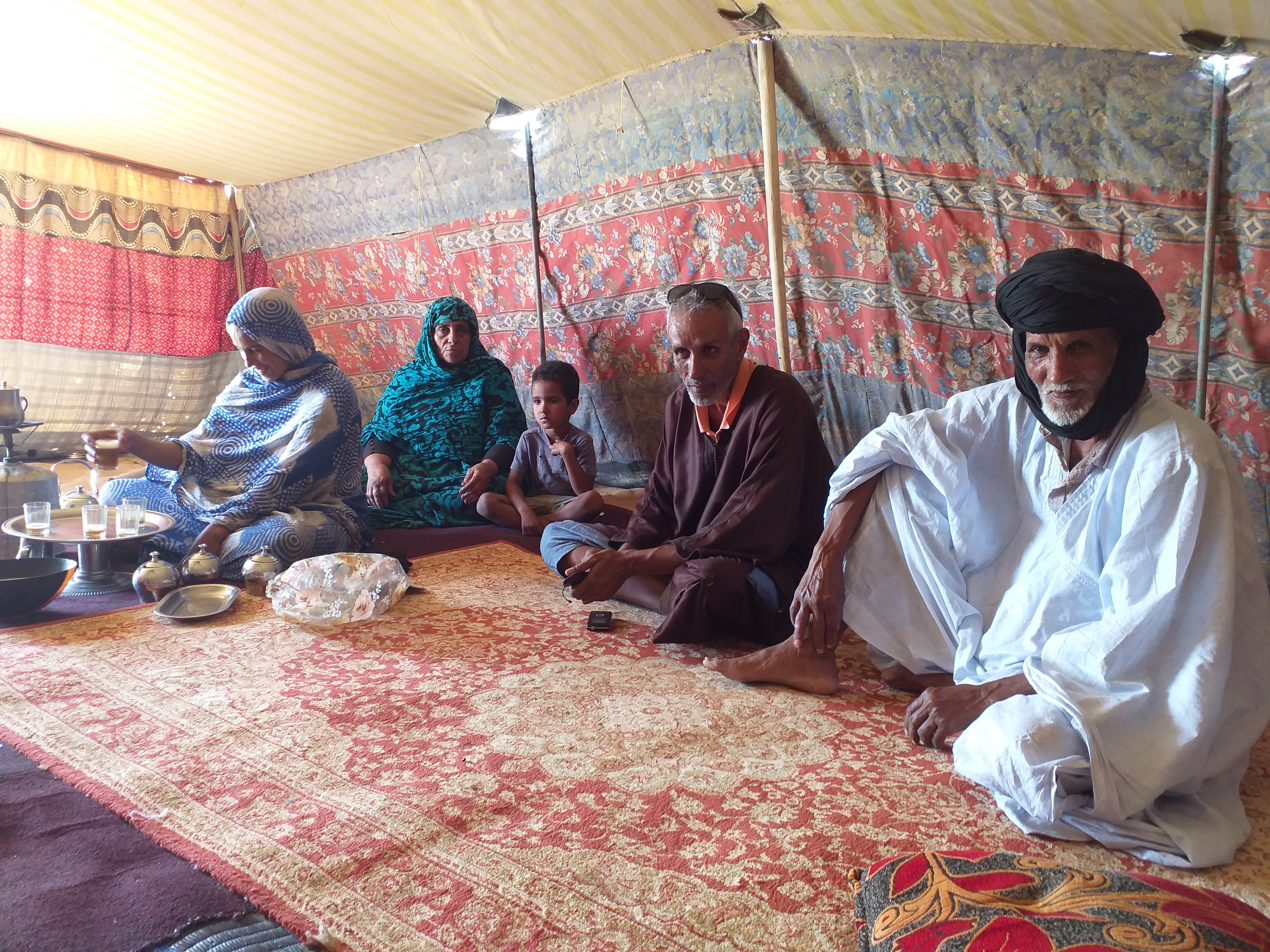
Moorish family in Mauritania

The Beidane people comprise roughly 30 percent of the population, making them the largest ethnic minority. Haratines (Black Moors) make up roughly 40 percent of the population and constitute the ethnic plurality. The remaining 30 percent are "Sub-Saharan Mauritanians," according to the 2023 CIA World Factbook entry on Mauritania.

Within Mauritanian society, there remains minority control of the country, with the Beidane (white Moors) controlling the national economy as well as a significant majority of the state including but not limited to the government, military, and the police forces.

Since there is no ethnicity data on the Mauritanian census, the government has reported that the majority of the population (the 70% consisting of Beidane and Haratine peoples) as Maure, which means "speaker of Hassaniya Arabic." However, while most Beidane peoples would associate themselves with the term, the majority of Haratines would distance themselves from the term as they consider themselves a separate ethnic group. Haratines are almost exclusively of black African origin, but are closely aligned with the Moorish population in terms of language and culture. According to Amnesty International "they have lost virtually every aspect of their African origins except their skin color." Their Moorish culture and their language are the result of generations of enslavement. They are thus referred to as "black Moors" to differentiate them from the "white Moors" who enslaved them, and from black Mauritanians who have not been enslaved by the Moors.

== Slavery ==
The nation has a long and extensive history of enslavement and racial slavery, with the Beidane or "white Moor" peoples historically ruling over the "black Moor" population.

During French colonial rule of Mauritania, France declared in 1905 that it would put an end to slavery in the country. The colonial power however, neglected to enforce such a decree and it was only officially outlawed in 1981, making it the last nation in the world to make such a law.

=== Continued Slavery in the Modern Era ===
According to the Unrepresented Nations and People Organization (UNPO), Mauritania passed a 2007 law that criminalized the possession of slaves as well as making special provisions and rules for the payment of slaves via their masters. This law, however, did not deter the owning and trading of slaves in Mauritania, and in an independent report from a United Nations independent expert, Gulnara Shahinian (the UN Special Rapporteur on Contemporary Forms of Slavery), she states "There are all forms of slavery in Mauritania. There is child labor, domestic labor, child marriages and human trafficking." She estimates that roughly 18 percent of Mauritania's current population of around 3.5 million people are enslaved as of 2009.

While slavery has officially been abolished by law in 1981, many Mauritanians, specifically the Haratine plurality, remain stuck in a "slave limbo" similar to indentured servitude, where they continue to be socio-economically dependent on the Beidane "masters" due to their position within the societal hierarchy.

== See also ==
- Moors
- Sahrawis
