= Mohamed Ould Maaouya =

Mauritanian politician

Mohamed Ould Maaouya (born 25 August 1953) is a Mauritanian politician who served as Minister of the Interior and Decentralization.

Ould Maaouya was born in Méderdra and received higher education in Nouakchott and France.

In 1984, he became Central Director of the Ministry of the Interior and served as Secretary-General of the Ministry of the Interior from 1984 to 1986; he was also a regional wāli (governor) in 1982 and 1986. He was Adviser to the Presidency of the Republic from 1989 to 1992, then Director of the Cabinet of Prime Minister Sidi Mohamed Ould Boubacar, with ministerial rank, from 1992 to 1996. From 1996 to 1997, he was Adviser to the Presidency of the Republic again. Subsequently, he was Secretary-General of the Ministry of Foreign Affairs and Cooperation from 1997 to 1999, Secretary-General of the Ministry of the Interior again from 1999 to 2002, and Secretary-General of the Ministry of Economic Affairs and Development from 2002 to 2005.

Following the August 2005 coup d'état that ousted President Ould Taya, Boubacar was appointed as prime minister for a second time, and Ould Maaouya returned as director of the Cabinet of Prime Minister with ministerial rank, holding that post from 2005 to 2007.

On 31 August 2008, he was appointed Minister of the Interior and Decentralization in the government named after the August 2008 coup d'état.
