= Cheikh Ahmed Baye =

President of Mauritania's National Assembly

Cheikh Ahmed Baye (also known as Cheikh Ould Baya) is a politician from Mauritania who served as President of the National Assembly of Mauritania from 9 October 2018 to 19 June 2023.

== Personal life ==
He was born in December 1954 in Tiris Zemmour Region. In 2013, he became mayor of Zouérat and became president of Association of Mayors of Mauritania in 2014.
