= Progressive Arab Front =

Lebanese political coalition

The Progressive Arab Front (Arabic: الجبهة العربية التقدمية) was a political coalition in Lebanon, founded by Kamal Jumblatt in October 1961. The coalition was founded in response to the break-up of the United Arab Republic. It opposed the Syrian separatism and called for support to Gamal Abdel Nasser. The Progressive Arab Front consisted of the Progressive Socialist Party and the Arab Nationalist Movement. It largely corresponded to the parliamentary National Struggle Front, but through the Progressive Arab Front the parliamentarian Issam al-Hajjar joined the six PSP members in the Chamber of Deputies. The program of the Progressive Arab Front was based on Arab nationalism and socialism.
