= 1961 Jordanian general election =

General elections were held in Jordan on 19 October 1961. As political parties were banned at the time, all candidates ran as independents.
