= Gulnara Shahinian =

Armenian diplomat and author

Shahinian in 2010 with UK Minister of State for Europe and the Americas Jeremy Browne

Gulnara Shahinian is an Armenian diplomat and author who studies human trafficking. She is a member of the Group of Experts on Action Against Trafficking in Human Beings and the former United Nations Special Rapporteur on Contemporary Forms of Slavery from 2006 until 2014.

She studied international law at the Saint Petersburg Institute of International Relations, and English and Russian Linguistics at Yerevan State University.

== Publications ==
- Shahinian, Gulnara (2015). “Traditions, Law and Practice: Migrant Domestic Workers in Lebanon.” In Siobhán Mullally, ed., Care, Migration and Human Rights: Law and Practice, pp. 131-149. London: Routledge
- United Nations Human Rights Council (2013). Report of the Special Rapporteur on contemporary forms of slavery, including its causes and consequences, Gulnara Shahinian: Thematic report on challenges and lessons in combating contemporary forms of slavery. A/HRC/24/43. 1 July.
- United Nations Human Rights Council (2014). Report of the Special Rapporteur on contemporary forms of slavery, including its causes and consequences, Gulnara Shahinian: Follow-up mission to Mauritania. A/HRC/27/53/Add.1. 26 August.
- Shahinian, Gulnara (2008). “Trafficking in persons in the South Caucasus – Armenia, Azerbaijan and Georgia: New challenges for transitional democracies.” In Sally Cameron and Edward Newman, eds., Trafficking in humans: Social, cultural and political dimensions, pp. 252-273. Tokyo: United Nations University Press.
