= Palestine Popular Liberation Organization =

Palestine Popular Liberation Organization (in Arabic: المنظمة الشعبية لتحرير فلسطين) was a Palestinian political organization. It was formed in 1964, on the eve of the first session of the Palestinian National Council which was held in May 1964. The headquarters of the PPLO had reportedly been in Jordan.

The PPLO comprised three streams: left-wing Arab Nationalists (with its base of Palestinian refugees in Syria), former members of the Arab Socialist Baath Party and the Jordanian Communist Party and elements from the Palestinian communities in Jordan and Kuwait. Muhammad Fayyad and Ibrahim Khraysha were the leaders of the group.

In May–June 1969, the Palestinian Revolutionary Left League and the PPLO merged into the Popular Democratic Front for the Liberation of Palestine (PDFLP). According to a declassified CIA report, the PPLO broke off from the PDFLP after that, and in February 1970 joined the United Fedayeen Command.
