= Arabic Toilers' Movement =

Political party

The Arabic Toilers' Movement (Arabic: حركة الكادحين العرب) was a political party in Iraq. It was founded in 1962, by a group that broke away from the Arab Socialist Baath Party who had adopted a Marxist-Leninist political line. After November 18, 1964, the Arabic Toilers' Movement began seeking cooperation with other Iraqi political forces as well as Dr. George Habash. The organization began cooperating with the Arab Socialist Union in the same year.

The organization did not last long, as several of its founders left and joined other political parties.
