= Arab Unity Party =

The Arab Unity Party (Arabic: حزب الوحدة العربية) was a political party in Iraq. The party was founded around late 1967 or 1968, as the group around Sobhi Abdul Hamid, Khalid Ali as-Salah and Khiruddin Hassib broke away from one of the factions of the Arab Socialist Movement. The activity of the party inside Iraq was ended by the July 17, 1968, revolution. But a smaller group of the party continued to function in exile. The party was disbanded in 1971, as Sobhi Abdul Hamid withdrew from his political activities.
