= Arab Ba'ath Progressive Party =

Arab Ba'ath Progressive Party حزب البعث العربي التقدمي
- Regional Secretary: Fuad Dabbour
- Assistant Regional Secretary: Mahmoud Muhailan
- Founded: 1993
- Dissolved: 2023
- Headquarters: Amman, Jordan
- Ideology: Neo-Ba'athism
- International affiliation: Ba'ath Party (Syrian-dominated faction)

Party flag

Website
- www.abpparty.org

The Arab Ba'ath Progressive Party (Arabic: حزب البعث العربي التقدمي Ḥizb al-Baʿṯ al-ʿArabī t-Taqaddumī, Arabic pronunciation: [ˈħiz.b‿al.ˈbaʕ.θ‿al.ˈʕa.ra.bi‿t.ta.ˈqad.du.miː]) was a political party in Jordan. It operated as the Jordanian regional branch of the Syrian-led Ba'ath Party.

It was legally registered for the first time in 1993. The party was small, but despite it small size, the branch was able to get a decent footprint in Jordanian media through its leader, Fuad Dabbour. The party was less known than its pro-Iraqi counterpart, the Jordanian Arab Socialist Ba'ath Party. Fuad Dabbour was the party's Regional Secretary. It was dissolved in 2023.

== Political platform ==
The party's stated objectives are:

- The struggle for the supremacy and institutionalization of democracy as well as the rule of law and constitution.
- The removal of control of the people’s will and achievement of political and economic reform in the interest of the people.
- Adherence to the monotheistic religions and respect of the national heritage and the Arab nation’s unity.
- Consolidation of the democratic system and the achievement of Arab economic integration.

== Leadership ==
Regional Secretary

- Fuad Dabbour

Assistant Regional Secretary

- Mahmoud Muhailan

== Electoral results ==
=== Jordanian Parliament ===
House of Representatives
Election	Votes	%	Seats	+/–	Position	Outcome	Leader
1997	Boycotted		0 / 80	–			Fuad Dabbour
2003	Boycotted		0 / 110	–			Fuad Dabbour
2007	Boycotted		0 / 110	–			Fuad Dabbour
2010	Boycotted		0 / 110	–			Fuad Dabbour
2013	Boycotted		0 / 150	–			Fuad Dabbour
2016			0 / 130	–			Fuad Dabbour
2020			0 / 130	–			Fuad Dabbour

== See also ==
- Jordanian Arab Socialist Ba'ath Party
- List of political parties in Jordan
