= Akram al-Homsi =

Jordanian politician

Akram al-Homsi (Arabic: أكرم الحمصي) is the Regional Secretary of the Jordanian Regional Command of the Jordanian branch of the Ba'ath Party.
