= Hindawi affair =

1986 failed airliner bombing

Coordinates: 51°28′19″N 0°26′58″W

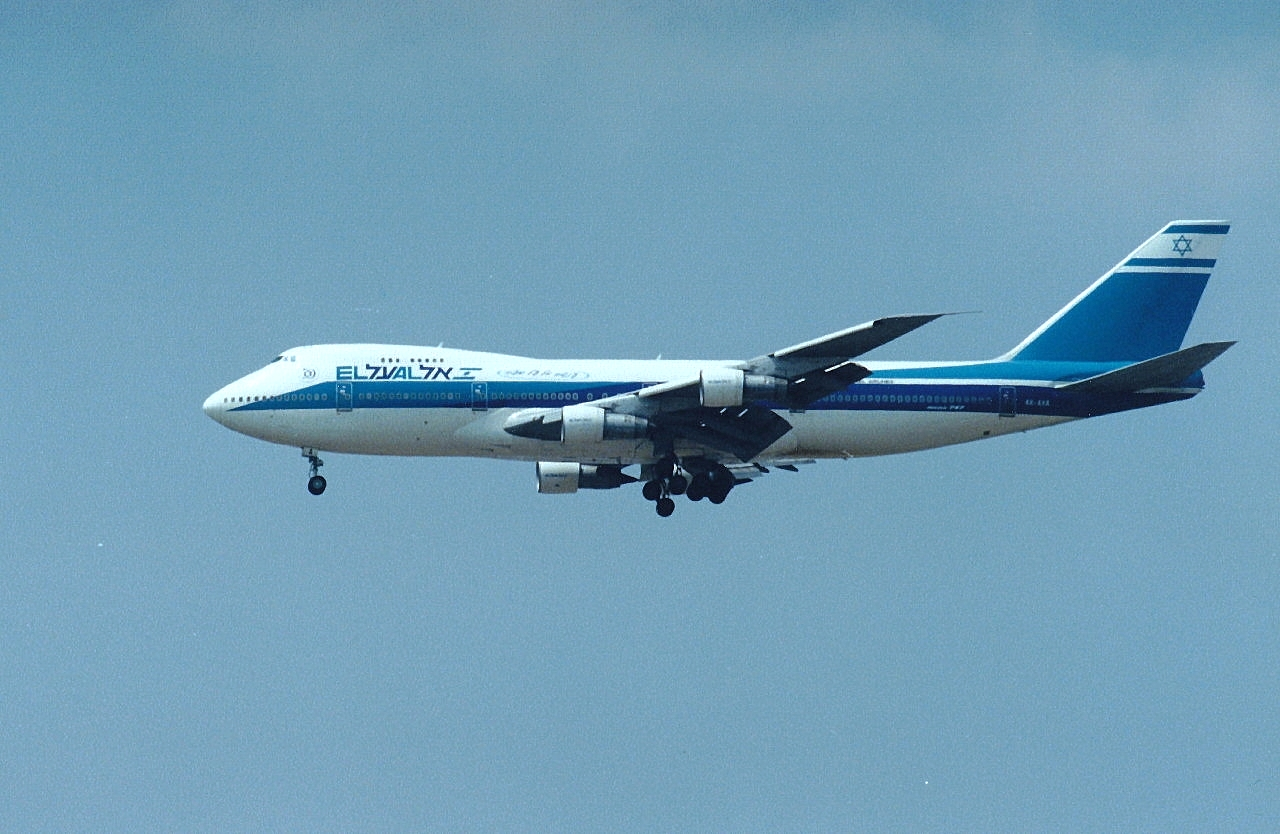
An El Al Boeing 747-258B

The Hindawi affair was a failed attempt to bomb El Al Flight 016, from London to Tel Aviv in April 1986 by Nezar Nawwaf al-Mansur al-Hindawi (Arabic: نزار نواف منصور الهنداوي, born 1954), a Jordanian citizen.

On the morning of 17 April 1986, at Heathrow Airport in London, Israeli security guards working for El Al Airlines found 1.5 kilograms (3.3 lb) of Semtex explosive in the bag of Anne-Marie Murphy, a five-month pregnant Irishwoman attempting to board a flight to Tel Aviv with 375 other passengers. In addition, a functioning calculator in the bag was found to be a timed triggering device. She claimed to be unaware of the contents, and that she had been given the bag by her fiancé, Nezar Hindawi, a Jordanian. Murphy maintained that Hindawi had sent her on the flight for the purpose of meeting his parents before marriage.

A manhunt ensued, resulting in Hindawi's arrest the following day after he surrendered to police. Hindawi was found guilty by the Central Criminal Court of England and Wales and was sentenced to 45 years' imprisonment by Mr Justice William Mars-Jones, which was at the time the longest determinate, or fixed, criminal sentence in British history.

Hindawi appealed. The Lord Chief Justice upheld the sentence, saying: "Put briefly, this was about as foul and as horrible a crime as could possibly be imagined. It is no thanks to this applicant that his plot did not succeed in destroying 360 or 370 lives in the effort to promote one side of a political dispute by terrorism. In the judgment of this Court the sentence of 45 years' imprisonment was not a day too long. This application is refused."

== Background ==
In January 1986, Israel forced down a private jet carrying Syrian officials to Damascus, which Israel had incorrectly supposed was carrying senior Palestinians. According to Seale, it was widely believed that the attack was in response to this indignation

When Murphy met Hindawi in 1984, she was working as a chambermaid at the Hilton Hotel, Park Lane in London.

When Murphy became pregnant with his child, Hindawi convinced her that they should go to Israel to get married. He also insisted that she should go on ahead since, as an Arab, it would take longer for him to obtain a visa. Unknown to Murphy, he intended her to take an explosive-laden bag on board an El Al flight from Heathrow Airport to Tel Aviv on 17 April 1986. He escorted her to the airport and instructed her not to mention his name, since Israeli security would interrogate her about their relationship.

Immediately after leaving Murphy at the airport at 8 am, Hindawi returned to London and then boarded the Syrian Arab Airlines bus to return to the airport to catch a 2 pm flight to Damascus. Before the bus set off, however, he heard the news that a bomb had been discovered in Heathrow. He left the bus, went to the Syrian embassy and there asked for assistance.

The ambassador passed him to the embassy security men, who took him to their lodgings, where they tried to change his appearance by cutting and dyeing his hair. For an unknown reason, early the next morning, 18 April, Hindawi fled from the Syrians and gave himself up to the British police.

He was interrogated intensively for a number of days, during which his sleep was interrupted. During his interrogations and later trial he described two conflicting stories leading up to the incident. During the interrogation, Hindawi claimed to have arranged the plot with high-ranking officers in Syrian Air Force intelligence a year earlier in Damascus, where he was given Syrian papers and instructions for operating the explosive. He supposedly conducted a training run back in England before returning again to Syria for final details and preparation. Hindawi said that the explosive was delivered to him in the Royal Garden Hotel in London on 5 April, less than two weeks prior to the attempted bombing. This story is supported by the fact that Hindawi had first sought refuge in the Syrian embassy after learning of the failed bombing, and that Syrian officials were in the process of altering his appearance before he fled again. Also, British intelligence had previously intercepted Syrian communications with Hindawi's name, Hindawi was using genuine Syrian documents although he was not Syrian, and Hindawi's original escape plan involved leaving England with Syrian agents working on Syrian Arab Airlines.

During the trial Hindawi retracted his confession and claimed that he was the victim of a conspiracy, probably by Israeli agents. He claimed that the police forced him to sign the statements attributed to him unread, threatened to hand him over to the Mossad and told him that his parents were also arrested in London.

In attempting to construct a credible defence for their client, Hindawi's legal counsel proposed during the trial an alternative interpretation of events, suggesting that Hindawi was being manipulated by Israeli intelligence, which wished to damage and embarrass the Syrian government. The jury was unconvinced by this version of events, and subsequent appeal judges have dismissed such interpretations as entirely lacking in evidence. Historian Benny Morris and journalist Ian Black (Middle East editor of The Guardian) similarly dismissed this interpretation of events.

== Repercussions ==
After the court found Hindawi guilty, the then-British Prime Minister Margaret Thatcher broke off diplomatic relations with Syria. Following this, the United States and Canada recalled their ambassadors from Syria. The European Community also imposed minor sanctions.

The Helsinki Warning of the Lockerbie disaster almost exactly matched Murphy's circumstances, except that the woman carrying the bomb would have been Finnish.

== Allegations of Mossad involvement ==
On 10 November 1986, French prime minister Jacques Chirac said in a recorded interview with the Washington Times, that German chancellor Kohl and foreign minister Genscher both believed that "the Hindawi plot was a provocation designed to embarrass Syria and destabilize the Assad regime ... 'by' ... people probably connected to Israeli Mossad". Chirac added that he tended to believe it himself. The German government denied the conversation and privately requested that Chirac retract his statement. Chirac was also criticised by the French president François Mitterrand. A few days later, Chirac changed his opinion and said to Pierre Beregovoy during French National Assembly debates that Israel was innocent.

In his interview with Time magazine on 20 October 1986, Syrian President Hafez al-Assad said that the Israeli intelligence agency planned the Hindawi operation. According to Seale, sources in Syrian intelligence told him that they "had fallen in to Israeli trap" and were penetrated and manipulated by Mossad to smear Syria with terrorism and isolate it internationally. Colonel Mufid Akkur, whom Hindawi named in court, was arrested in Damascus on suspicion of working for Israel.

Israeli intelligence operative Ari Ben-Menashe wrote in his memoir in 1992 that the Hindawi affair was an operation which had been conceived by Israeli intelligence. The organizer of the plot was Rafi Eitan who led Israeli intelligence's anti-terrorist group. The operation was meant to implicate the Syrian embassy in London as involved in terrorism and have all the Syrian diplomats expelled from England. Jordanian Mohammed Radi Abdullah, a paid Israeli agent, offered his cousin Hindawi $50,000 to place explosives by way of his girlfriend on the flight. Radi then arranged for Hindawi to meet a Syrian intelligence officer who arranged the details of the plot.

Atef Abu Bakr, senior operative at the Abu Nidal Organization at the time, maintains that the operation failed because Nizar al-Hindawi leaked information about it and ponders that relationship between al-Hindawi and the Mossad. He said that Nizar was a "multi-loyal person who worked with Syrians and others and even with the "enemy" (i.e., Jordan)… His father was a cook at the Jordanian embassy and was revealed as a Mossad agent."

The allegation of Mossad involvement, however, is contradicted by evidence of Syrian sponsorship: including Hindawi's statements on interrogation, correspondence intercepted by the authorities after his arrest, the testimony of other captured terrorists, and the support provided by Syrian Arab Airlines. The Syrian government's claim that the Mossad replaced originally innocent luggage with the bomb is refuted by the discovery of hair belonging to Hindawi trapped under the tape used to attach the explosive to the bag. (Note: Originally published in The National Interest, Spring 1989.)

== Aftermath ==
In April 2001 Nezar Hindawi became eligible for parole, but his right of appeal was denied by the then Home Secretary David Blunkett, a decision upheld by the Court of Appeal.

In December 2011, Anne-Marie Murphy instigated legal action to sue Slate magazine for alleged defamation in an online article.

In 2012, the parole board reversed its previous decision to free Hindawi. A parole board spokesman refused to comment on the case but said that "the only legal question which the parole review has to answer is the risk of a further offence occurring during the parole window, weighed against the benefits to the prisoner and public of a longer period of testing on parole. Risk is the overriding factor".

In March 2013, Hindawi was granted parole, but later was deported to Jordan.

== Cultural references ==
- The 1988 novel Special Deception by Alexander Fullerton uses the Hindawi trial as the background to a Soviet plot to stage an atrocity in Syria which will be blamed on the British government.
- Simon, one of the main characters in Atom Egoyan's 2008 film Adoration, claims that his father planted a bomb in his pregnant wife's luggage before she flew to Israel.
- Playwright Lucile Lichtblau won a 2011 Susan Glaspell Award for her work, The English Bride, inspired by the Hindawi affair. The play features a Mossad officer who unravels the story of a woman named Eileen Finney and the Arab man with whom she has fallen in love. A production directed by Carl Wallnau ran at 59E59 Theaters in autumn 2013.

== See also ==
- State-sponsored terrorism
- Arab–Israeli conflict

== Bibliography ==
- Seale, Patrick. Asad of Syria: The Struggle for the Middle East. Los Angeles: University of California Press, 1988. ISBN 0-520-06976-5, 475–482 p.
- Seale, Patrick (1993). Abu Nidal: A gun for hire. Arrow. ISBN 0-09-922571-9.
- Black, Ian. Israel's Secret Wars: A History of Israel's Intelligence Services. New York: Grove Press, 1991. ISBN 0-8021-1159-9, 433–437 p.
- "Terrorism: The Syrian Connection" by Daniel Pipes, originally published in The National Interest, Spring 1989.
