= Jordanian Democratic People's Party =

Jordanian Democratic People's Party حزب الشعب الديمقراطي الأردني
- Founded: 1989; 37 years ago
- Split from: DFLP
- Headquarters: Amman
- Ideology: Communism; Marxism–Leninism; Palestinian nationalism Anti-Zionism; Left-wing nationalism Secularism
- Political position: Far-left

Party flag

Website
- https://www.hashd-ahali.org/

Jordanian Democratic People's Party (Arabic: حزب الشعب الديمقراطي الأردني Hizb Al-Sha'ab Al-Dimuqrati Al-Urduni, HASHD), is a Marxist-Leninist party in Jordan. HASHD was formed in 1989, when the Democratic Front for the Liberation of Palestine separated their branch in Jordan to become a separate party.

HASHD publishes the weekly newspaper Al-Ahali. In the past, the party published the weekly newspaper al Lajna al Shaabiya.

== See also ==
- List of political parties in Jordan
