= Jordanian Democratic Popular Unity Party =

Jordanian Democratic Popular Unity Party حزب الوحدة الشعبية الديمقراطي الأردني
- Founded: 20 November 1990
- Registered: 9 February 1993
- Split from: PFLP
- Headquarters: Amman
- Newspaper: Nida'a al-Watan
- Ideology: Arab socialism Palestinian nationalism (Diaspora nationalism); Democratic socialism Secularism; Left-wing nationalism
- Political position: Left-wing
- Colors: Black, red, white and green (Pan-Arab colors)
- Slogan: For a democratic national Jordan and the recovery of the legitimate national rights of the Palestinian people

Website
- wihdaparty.com

Jordanian Democratic Popular Unity Party (Arabic: حزب الوحدة الشعبية الديمقراطي الأردني Hizb Al-Wahdah Al-Sha'abiyah Al-Dimuqratiyyah Al-Urduniy), commonly known as Wihda, is a political party in Jordan. The party was formed in 1990, when the Popular Front for the Liberation of Palestine separated their branch in Jordan to become a separate party. The party often critiques Jordan's lack of political reform, particularly of its electoral law. As a result, they boycotted both the 2010 and 2013 elections. Although, they are primarily focused on implementing a socialist Jordan and securing Palestinian independence. Other goals include eradicating settler colonialism, strengthening labor unions, allowing freedom of speech, preventing government corruption, expanding social services, and promoting higher education. Its current secretary general is Dr. Saeed Dhiyab.

The editor-in-chief of their website is Hisham Alqam.

== Beliefs ==
The party's objectives are as follows: "Establishing national democratic rule, where people are the source of authorities, thus achieving the state of law and institutions in order to stabilize the concepts and values of justice, freedom, creativity, thinking, and national unity. ... Deepening the progressive social content of the social revolution, especially in the field of equality between men and women. Defending the country against any foreign ambitions, especially the expansionist ambitions of the Zionist entity. ... achieving a free democratic unity upon the establishment of an independent Palestinian state on the Palestinian land."

Its official strategic goals are: "to build a socialist Jordanian society as part of a unified Arab socialist society, and the party affirms that socialism is still the optimal social system for resolving the economic, social, political and cultural dilemmas facing humanity, and socialism represents the optimal social system and the historical humanitarian alternative to the system." They aim to, "liberate Palestine from Zionist settler colonialism and establish a democratic Palestinian state on the entire land of Palestine with Jerusalem as its capital."

On the Gaza war, the party has reiterated its condemnation of Zionism and its commitment to an independent Palestine, arguing for "Adopting resistance in all its forms, most notably armed struggle, as the only feasible and fruitful approach to confronting the Zionist aggression and displacement project, and as a natural, human, religious, and national duty and right approved by international conventions and laws; Its legitimacy is above any demonization, controversy, or attempt at confusion and distortion intentionally by the global colonial powers." Demands include stopping the aggression in the region and opening the Rafah crossing. They call for the canceling of the Wadi Araba Agreement and argue for the removal of foreign military bases on Jordanian soil. Additionally, they hope to protect the Al-Aqsa Mosque and restore compulsory conscription.

== Leadership ==
Members of the Political Bureau after the 7th Conference
Name	Title
Dr. Saeed Dhiyab	Secretary-General
Dr. Essam Al-Khawaja	Deputy Secretary-General and Regulatory Department Officer
Mr. Abdel Majeed Dendis	Head of Political Relations Department
Dr. Musa Al-Azab	Head of Department of Culture and Party Education
M. Abdul Aziz Al-Hindawi	Head of Economic and Financial Department
Mr. Imad Al-Malhi	Head of Labor Department
A. Khalil Alyan	
Dr. Fouad Habash	Head of Professional Work Department
M. Ammar Al-Helsa	
Mr. Bashar Assaf	Head of Youth and Student Work Department
Mr. Hisham Alqam	Head of Information Department

== See also ==
- List of political parties in Jordan
