= Jordanian nationalism =

Flag of Jordan

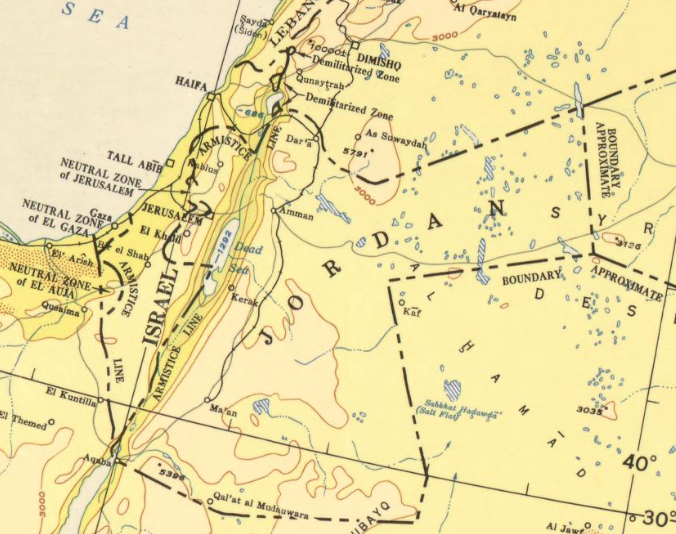
Map of Jordan with the West Bank in 1955

Jordanian nationalism, also known as Transjordanian nationalism or East Bank nationalism, is a nationalistic ideology that considers the Jordanian people a separate nation and strives to maintain Jordan as an independent nation-state. It emerged as one of three nationalist currents in the 1920s, and was opposed to both Palestinian nationalism present in the region, as well as the Hashemite Arab nationalism promoted by Abdullah I, the first ruler of the Emirate of Transjordan.

The Emirate of Transjordan was established in 1921 as a British protectorate to satisfy the wartime promise made to its Hashemite allies against the Ottomans. The Hashemite royal family faced challenge to their rule from local tribes, as they pursued "Hashemite Arab nationalism" as the guiding principle of their emirate. Hashemite Arabism was dedicated to establishing Greater Syria under Hashemite rule, with Transjordan being considered the first step towards greater unification rather than a separate nation on its own.

Before 1921, people of Transjordan defined themselves not through a national identity but regional ones, based on their religion, village or regionalism - therefore localism prevailed. Jordanian nationalism emerged in opposition to the "foreign other", which were defined as both the British and the Hashemite dynasty. While the Jordanian identity was still nascent at that time, it was explicitly based on anti-Hashemitism. Irene Maffi identified the Jordanian national movement as a major obstacle to Hashemite pan-Arabism, together with the strong Palestinian identity that already started forming during the colonial period. Jordanian nationalism started developing further in the 1920s and fought for the interests of the indigenous population, opposing Hashemite policies and rejecting their rule as foreign.

The main distinguishing trait of Jordanian nationalism was that it did not seek the unification of Transjordan into other Arab states; it also regarded Transjordan and Palestine as two separate peoples and nations, as opposed to the Hashemite attempts to integrate Palestine. The first expression of the Transjordanian national identity was the Adwan Rebellion of 1923, where the Adwan tribe rebelled against the Hashemite dynasty with the slogan “Transjordan for Transjordanians”. Because of its opposition to both a pan-Arab state and a Jordanian–Palestinian union, Jordanian national movement is also known as "East Bank exclusivism".

== History ==
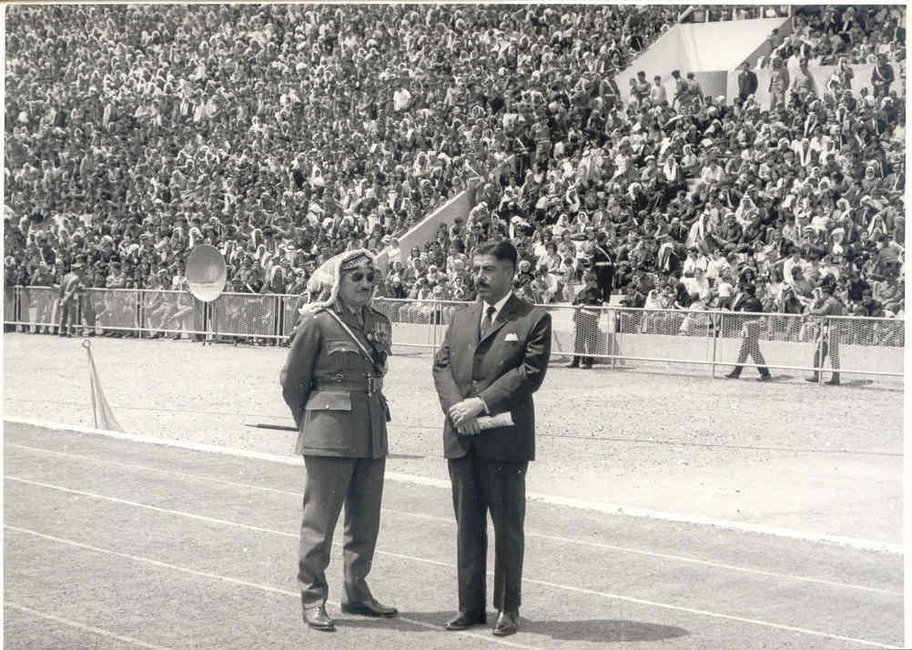
Symbols of Jordanian nationalism: Field marshal Habis Al-Majali and former Prime Minister Wasfi Al-Tal at the Amman International Stadium in 1967.

The existence of a national community in Transjordan before 1921 was attributed to its homogeneity — Transjordan was far more homogenous than any other mandate territories in the Middle East, and the only significant split amongst the population was based on mode of life and economy, with 54% of the population being sedentary and 46% nomadic Bedouin. Christians constituted about 10% of the population in the 1920s and were split amongst Greek Catholics, Roman Catholics and Greek Orthodox Christians; they were significant minorities in Karak as well as Salt. Apart from Christians, another significant minority were Circassians, who made up about 5% of the population. Despite this, relations between the Sunni Arab majority and ethnoreligious minorities were good, and any conflicts between them were "less a matter of religion or ethnicity than a facet of the competition between pastoralists and peasants for control of land".

According to Nür Köprülü, one of the first expressions of Transjordanian identity was the 1910 Karak revolt, arguing that it should be "posited on a central place within the political history of Jordanian entity with respect to its nation building." The revolt was sparked by excessive taxation and conscription policies implemented by Young Turks, who sought to accelerate the Ottoman control over the hitherto neglected territory. Apart from the Karaks, the revolt was also supported by local Druze, Bedouins and also Aljun farmers. The revolt was also joined by the Majali family who were local rulers of Karak and were angered by the Turkish nationalist policy of Young Turks, which provided no toleration to regional particularism espoused by local Transjordanian sultans and tribes.

The regional and political capital of the Syrian province, Damascus, was too distant to have impacted the society of Transjordan. Therefore, local and regional identities developed in the region instead of the Syrian one. Given the marginalized status of Transjordan, state security was largely non-existing — local and tribal bonds dominated in Transjordan and provided protective social and economic affiliation through kinship and husbandry instead. The most important tribes in Transjordan were the Huwaytat, the Bani Sakher, the Adwan, and the Bani Hasan. Roger Owen also argues that Transjordan was indirectly ruled and not subject to colonization, which further allowed the widespread regionalism and tribalism to be left undisturbed.

The country was established as the Emirate of Transjordan in 1921 as a British protectorate, in exchange for its wartime alliance against the Ottoman Empire during the 1916 Great Arab Revolt. When Abdullah I formed his first royal cabinet that year, it was completely devoid of Transjordanian natives and was exclusively composed of Syrian nationalists. Owen remarked that it "looked like a government in exile and aptly symbolized Abdullah’s ambitions to move on to Damascus". The cabinet outraged the local population, sparking indigenous opposition to what was denounced as "rule by Syrians". The tensions between the indigenous Transjordanians and Syrian-dominated government culminated in the Adwan Rebellion in 1923 — the Adwan tribe sought to depose Hashemites and replace their rule with a new government composed of local natives, while keeping Transjordan independent. Because of this, the main slogan of the rebellion was “Transjordan for Transjordanians”. Apart from the Adwan revolt, Abdullah also faced warnings from the Bani Sakher tribe, which threatened to oust the Hashemites if they did not abandon their focus on pan-Arab ambitions instead of focusing on improving the social conditions of Transjordan.

In February 1928, Transjordan signed an agreement with the United Kingdom that allowed British forces to manage Transjordanian security and defense facilities in return for British financial, military and political support, on which the Hashemite regime became increasingly dependent on. The royal government also introduced limited self-government with the Organic Law of 1928, which created an elected legislative council paired with an executive council, but ultimately left power in the hands of the Emir. This intensified the problem of foreign overrepresentation, with government bureaucrats being increasingly composed of British and Palestinian officials. This continued the resistance to Hashemite rule by local tribes in addition to local sultan dynasties such as the Majalis and the Tarawna.

Hashemites continued to treat Transjordan as the starting point of Greater Syria, with Abdullah negotiating with the Peel Commission to include his plan of negotiating the West Bank and East Bank under his rule. As this proposal was rejected, Abdullah abandoned his Syrian ambitions and instead looked to expand his rule onto Palestine, actively influencing Palestinian politics. In September 1945, United Kingdom offered to bring Palestine under Transjordanian control, and Abdullah was allowed to deploy his forces in Palestine before British withdrawal in 1948, gaining control over the West Bank just before the Israeli declaration of independence. Transjordan then annexed the West Bank and changed its name to Jordan in June 1949. On 24 April 1950, the West Bank was officially integrated into Jordan, bringing 700,000 Palestinians under Hashemite rule.

The annexation of the West Bank by Jordan reinforced a separate Jordanian identity as socioeconomic and political tensions emerged between them and Palestinians. The word Palestine and its derivatives were excluded from Jordan's name and were also completely erased from official documents, with its usage being eventually completely prohibited. Palestinians had a strong sense of their own, separate national identity by then, which led them to oppose Hashemite control. Jordanian-Palestinian tensions culminated in King Abdullah's assassination from the hand of a Palestinian nationalist in 1951. This led to widespread rejection of a national community between Palestinians and Transjordanian, with both groups seeking separate, independent national identities instead. Both sides accused each other of either "Jordanization" of Palestinians or "Palestinization" of Jordan, as annexation of the West Bank made Palestinians a majority in the country.

Tensions ended following the Six-Day War and the Israeli occupation of the West Bank. After the loss of the West Bank, Jordan attempted to expel Palestinian organizations and militants from its territory, who perceived Jordanian territory as a springboard for the Palestinian nationalist movement. Jordanian operations against the activity of the Palestine Liberation Organization led to Black September in 1970, as the fighting between Jordanian security forces and Palestinian guerrillas escalated into a civil war. The war further intensified with the Syrian invasion of Jordan. However, Syria sustained heavy losses and had to withdraw, and Palestinian organizations were successfully expelled from Jordan, moving their headquarters to Syria and Lebanon instead. In 1988, Hussein of Jordan officially disengaged Jordan from Palestinian politics, stating that "Jordan is Jordan" and "Palestine is Palestine". This marked the point of Hashemite dynasty abandoning its Pan-Arab ambitions in favor of a separate Jordanian identity.

== See also ==
- Palestinian nationalism
- Pan-Arabism
- Lebanese nationalism
