= 2020 Israel–Palestine peace plan =

Israel–Palestine peace proposal in 2020 by the Trump administration

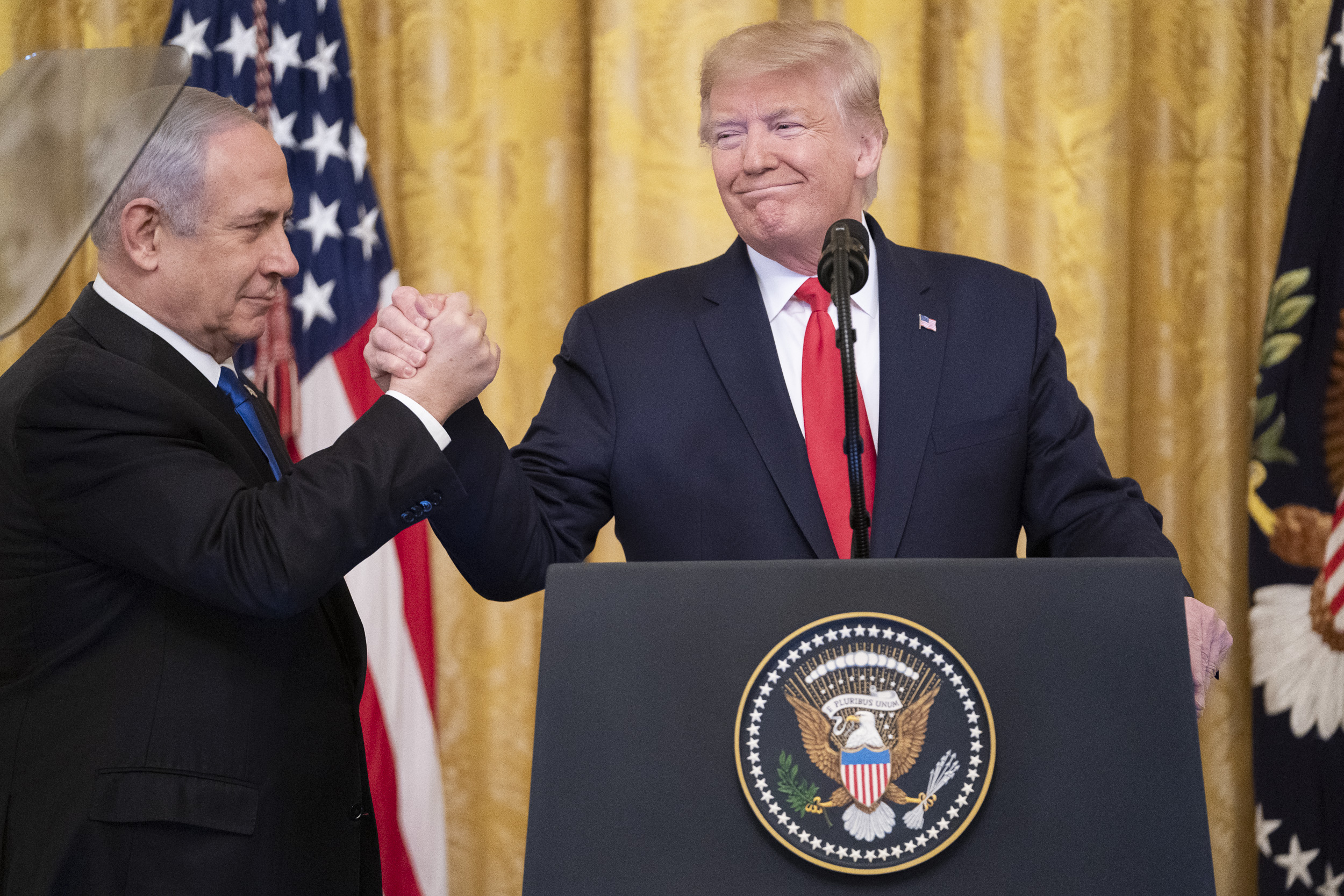
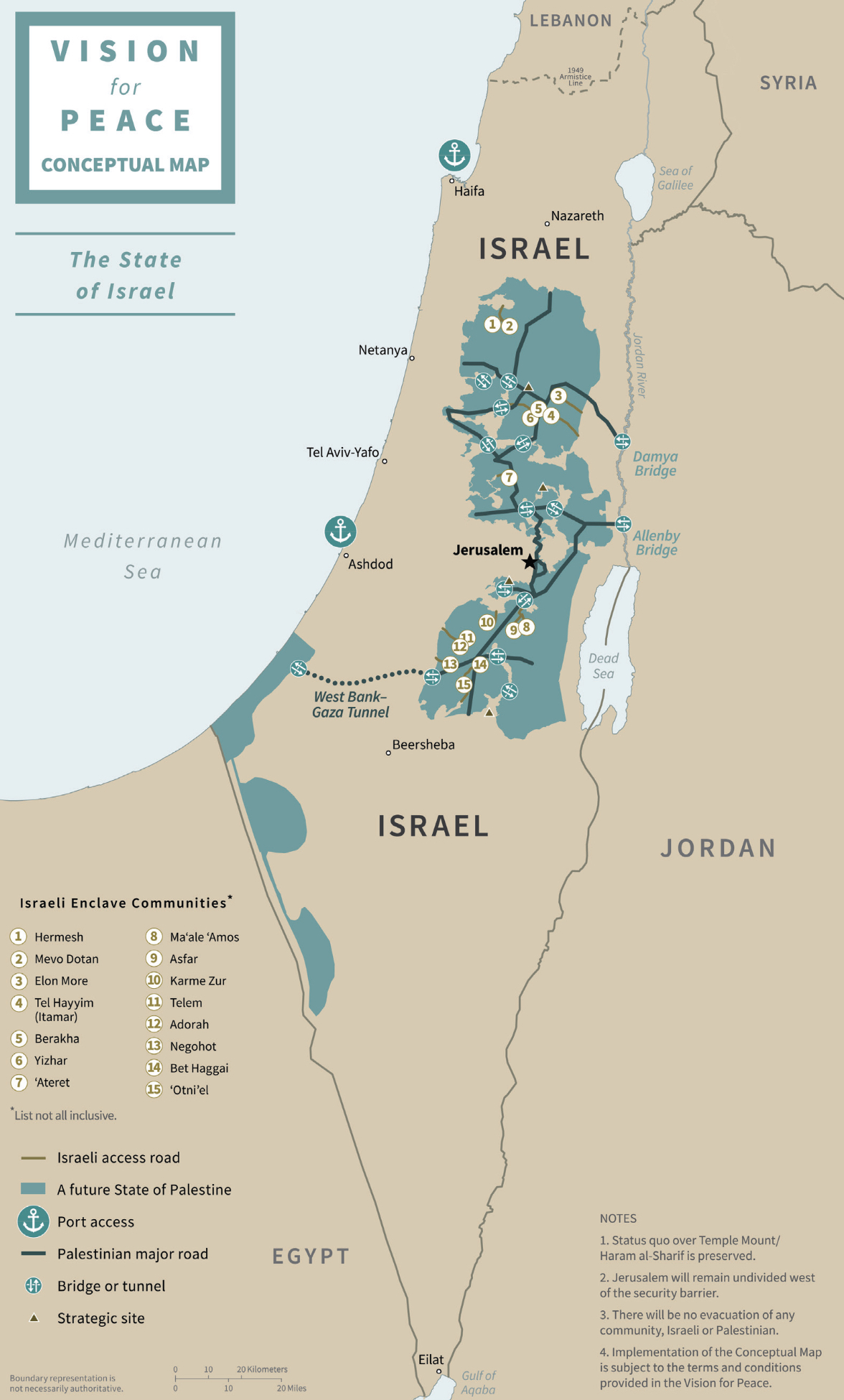
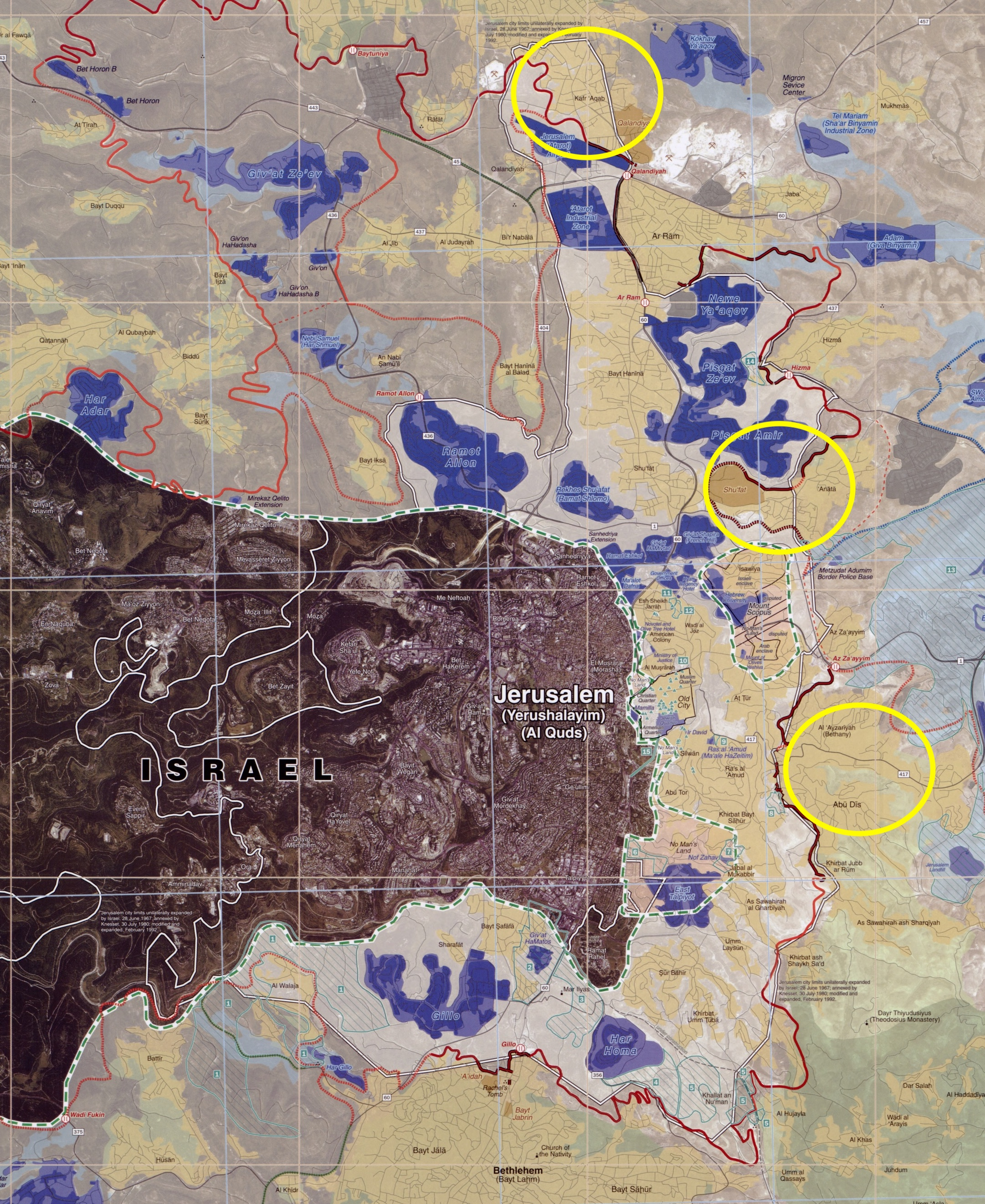
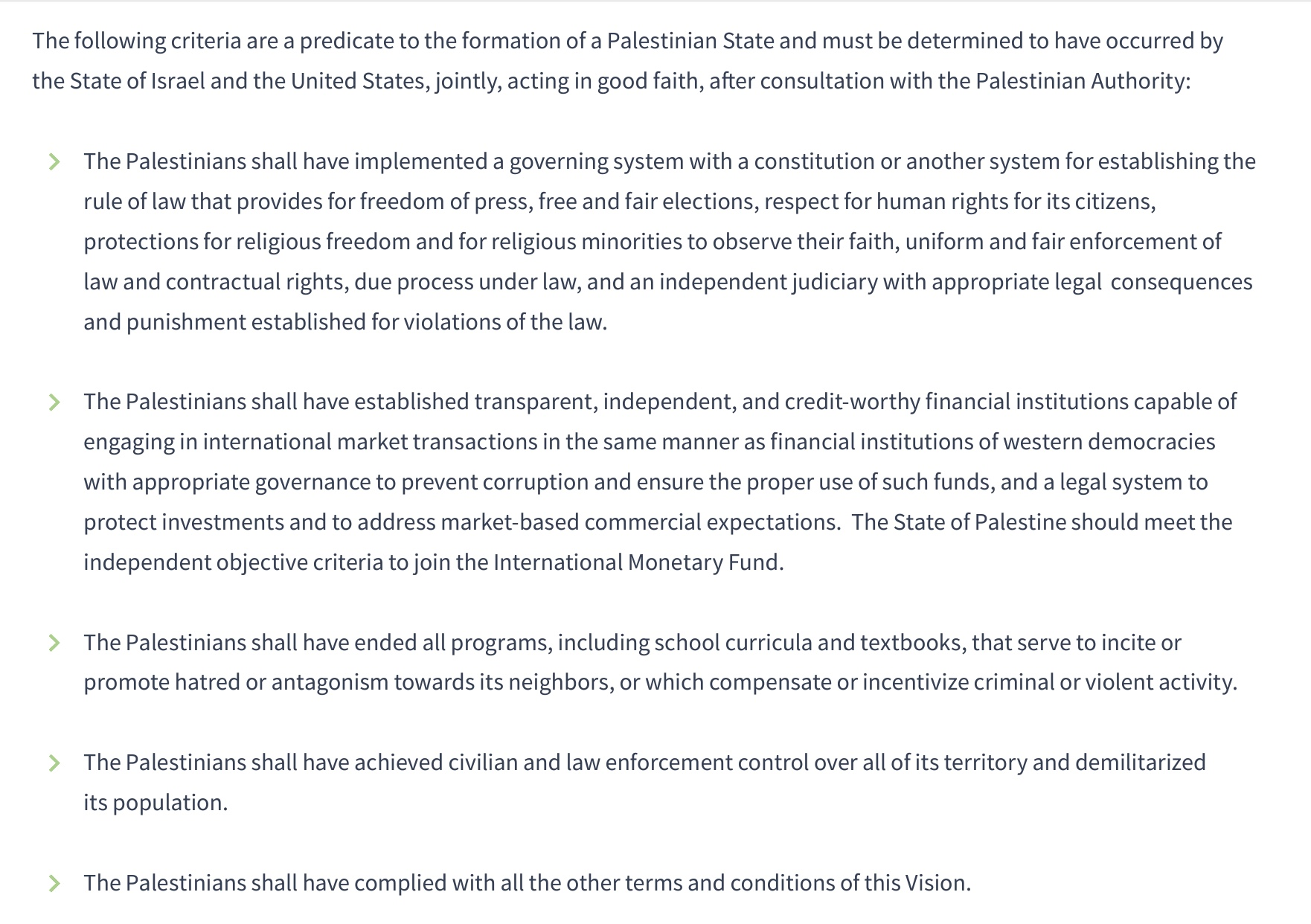
From left to right, top to bottom:
- Trump and Netanyahu at the presentation of the peace plan
- A map of proposed Israeli borders with the Palestinian enclaves
- A map of proposed areas for a Palestinian capital (yellow circles)
- A list of prerequisites for a Palestinian state
- A video of Trump's opening remarks

On January 28, 2020, United States president Donald Trump formally unveiled a plan to resolve the Israeli–Palestinian conflict in a White House press conference alongside Israeli prime minister Benjamin Netanyahu. The plan, officially titled Peace to Prosperity: A Vision to Improve the Lives of the Palestinian and Israeli People, had been delayed by two years and previously rejected by Palestine, which was not invited to the meeting.

The plan was authored by a team led by Trump's son-in-law and senior advisor, Jared Kushner. Both the Jewish West Bank settlers' Yesha Council and the Palestinian leadership opposed the plan, the former because it envisaged a Palestinian state, and the latter arguing that it was too biased in favor of Israel. The plan was divided into two parts, an economic portion and a political portion. On June 22, 2019, the Trump administration released the economic portion of the plan, titled "Peace to Prosperity". The political portion was released in late January 2020.

The plan had been characterized as requiring too few concessions from the Israelis and imposing too harsh requirements on the Palestinians. Reactions among congressional Democrats were mixed, and all the leading Democratic 2020 presidential candidates denounced it as a "smokescreen" for annexation. Proposed benefits to the Palestinians from the plan were contingent on Israel and the United States subsequently agreeing that a list of conditions have been implemented, including total demilitarization, abandonment of international legal action against Israel and the United States, and compliance "with all the other terms and conditions" of the 180-page plan. Many of these conditions were denounced by opponents of the plan as "impossible" or "fantastic". The plan proposed a series of Palestinian enclaves surrounded by an enlarged Israel, and rejected a Palestinian capital in East Jerusalem proper, proposing instead a Palestinian capital on the outskirts of the city. The proposed areas for the Palestinian capital have been described as "grim neighborhoods" and are separated from Jerusalem proper by the Israeli West Bank barrier. Many Israeli settlers have expressed discontent and concern with the plan's security assurances.

During the press conference announcing the plan, Netanyahu announced the Israeli government would immediately annex the Jordan Valley and West Bank settlements while committing not to create new settlements in areas left to the Palestinians for at least four years. U.S. Ambassador to Israel David M. Friedman claimed the Trump administration had given permission for an immediate annexation, stating that "Israel does not have to wait at all" and that "we will recognize it". A spokesman for the Israeli governing Likud party tweeted that Israeli sovereignty over settlements would be declared on the following Sunday. The Trump administration clarified that no such green light for annexation had been given; Trump later explained that "I got angry and I stopped it because that was really going too far".

== Israeli–Palestinian conflict ==
The Balfour Declaration was a public statement issued by the British government in 1917 during the First World War announcing support for the establishment of a "national home for the Jewish people" in Palestine, then an Ottoman region with a small minority Jewish population. The proposal was subsequently endorsed by the League of Nations as part of partitioning of the Ottoman lands. In 1917, Jews constituted less than 8% of the population; by 1947, due mainly to subsequent immigration, they comprised about 33% of the inhabitants, though owning just 7% of the land. That year the United Nations adopted a Partition Plan, which allotted 56% of the land to 30% of the population that was Jewish, although the majority of allocated land was the Negev desert. The Palestinian leadership and the Arab nations rejected the plan, resulting in the 1947–1949 Palestine war. By the war's end, Israel controlled 78% of Mandatory Palestine, and much of the local Arab populace had either been expelled or fled.

According to the IDF, Palestinians constitute the majority of the population in the area Israel now controls (Israel, the Gaza Strip, and the West Bank). Both Clinton's and the subsequent Trump plan confine most of that majority to an area less than a quarter of the land.

The West Bank and Gaza, occupied since 1948 by Jordan and Egypt, respectively, were captured by Israel during the 1967 Six-Day War. Shortly after the 1967 war Israel began building settlements in the land, in violation of international law.

=== Two states ===
In 1974, a UN resolution on the "Peaceful settlement of the question of Palestine" called for "two States, Israel and Palestine ... side by side within secure and recognized borders" together with "a just resolution of the refugee question in conformity with UN resolution 194".

Following the signing of the Oslo Accords in 1993, the Palestinians gained limited autonomy in a scattered mosaic of small areas in the West Bank. There followed a cycle of negotiations, suspension, mediation, restart of negotiations and suspension again. A number of agreements were reached, until the Oslo process ended after the failure of the Camp David Summit in 2000 and the outbreak of the Second Intifada.

=== United Nations ===
Section 2 of the plan gives an "Overview of United Nations efforts" and notes that close to 700 UNGA (non-legally binding) and over 100 UNSC (legally binding) resolutions have not brought about peace. The plan says that critical recommendations are disputed both as to their meaning and legal effect and have enabled political leaders to avoid addressing the complexities of the conflict rather than allowing a realistic path to peace. Of these resolutions, François Dubuisson says that they have affirmed the Palestinian right to self-determination, that territory claimed by Palestine is under belligerent occupation, that Israeli settlements are illegal and that the annexation of East Jerusalem was illegal. Dubuisson also stated that Israel is under an obligation to withdraw from the territories it occupied, that all states in the region have a right to secure and recognized borders and that Palestinians who became refugees during the conflict have a right of return or to fair compensation. Section 21 of the plan stipulates that a final agreement will be proposed in a new UN Security Council resolution and a new United Nations General Assembly resolution.

=== Present position ===
As of September 2025, Palestine has been recognized as a state by 147 UN members, and has had the status of UN non-member observer state since 2012. Israel, the United States and most Western countries do not recognize Palestine as a state. The United Nations use the terms "Palestine", "State of Palestine", and "occupied Palestinian territory" (oPt or OPT) interchangeably depending on context. Specifically the term "occupied Palestinian territory" refers as a whole to the geographical area of the Palestinian territory occupied by Israel since 1967. References to land or territory refer to land claimed by the State of Palestine. (Note: On 17 December 2012, UN Chief of Protocol Yeocheol Yoon declared that "the designation of 'State of Palestine' shall be used by the Secretariat in all official United Nations documents", thus recognising the title 'State of Palestine' as the state's official name for all UN purposes; on 21 December 2012, a UN memorandum discussed appropriate terminology to be used following GA 67/19. It was noted therein that there was no legal impediment to using the designation Palestine to refer to the geographical area of the Palestinian territory. At the same time, it was explained that there was also no bar to the continued use of the term "Occupied Palestinian Territory including East Jerusalem" or such other terminology as might customarily be used by the Assembly.) Dubuisson asserts that UN resolutions "establish all the principles that should guide the resolution of the Israeli-Palestinian conflict" and that the Trump plan does not apply, or even mention, any of these principles deferring instead to Israel's security concerns and the recognition of its "valid legal and historical claims". Nickolay Mladenov, the United Nations Special Coordinator for the Middle East Peace Process since 2015, points out the dangers inherent in the current situation stating "There is no Middle East peace process".

== United States policy changes and development of the plan ==
Development of the plan began in November 2017, led by Kushner, chief negotiator Jason Greenblatt, deputy national security adviser Dina Powell, and ambassador David Friedman. Kushner, a property developer married to Trump's daughter Ivanka, had no prior experience of diplomacy, asked the parties not to talk about history, and reportedly never discussed his plan with the Palestinians. According to Peter Beinart of Jewish Currents, "another key participant in drafting the proposal was David Friedman, who became Trump's ambassador to Israel after representing his bankrupt casinos." He reportedly had close ties to the Israeli settlers in the occupied West Bank, compared Jewish American critics of Israel to collaborators with Nazism and was skeptical about the idea that Palestinians should have a state.

In December 2017, following through on a campaign promise and a 1995 U.S. law, Trump recognized Jerusalem as Israel's capital. A key member of Trump's team, the Arabist Dina Powell, left the team "on good terms" two days after the announcement. The move was condemned by Arab countries, and Palestinians broke off contacts with the Trump administration, though maintaining intelligence cooperation with the CIA. Trump reacted by ending both bilateral aid for Palestinians and contributions for UNRWA, citing the PA's refusal to take part in the administration's peace initiative. The United States also shut down the Palestinian diplomatic office in Washington.

In February 2019, Kushner and his personal adviser Berkowitz flew to Oman, Bahrain, Qatar, the United Arab Emirates, Turkey and Saudi Arabia in order to unveil their closely guarded plan. Qatari Foreign Ministry Spokeswoman Lolwah Al Khater gave no indication that the meeting had provided much detail regarding the political plan. Jason Greenblatt, who played an important role in Trump's 25 March 2019 recognition of the Golan Heights as part of Israel, was thereafter shunned by the Palestinian authority. In the Palestinian view, Greenblatt, throughout his two years of engagement, acted as Israel's spokesman, a country he would never criticize, while he would frequently lambast the Palestinian side on his Twitter account. In April 2019, Greenblatt said that plan does not call for a confederation model or for a transfer of land from Egypt's Sinai Peninsula to the Palestinians. When asked in June 2019, Greenblatt said that the Trump plan "will include a resolution to all of the core issues, including the refugee issue, and will also focus on Israel's security concerns". In November 2019, the United States abandoned its four-decade-old position that Jewish settlements in the West Bank were inconsistent with international law.

To sway Trump, whose initial impression in 2017 was that Netanyahu did not want peace, Netanyahu tried to convince Trump that it was the Palestinians who were hostile to peace, and he adopted metaphors related to Trump's interests. The Palestinians wanted to draw the border as close to Tel Aviv as the George Washington Bridge was to the Trump Tower, and an enduring peace was as probable as "a hole-in-one through a brick wall". According to Israel Kasnett of the Jewish News Syndicate, the U.S. policy changes between 2017 and 2019 are described by "Mideast experts and Israel advocates" as a paradigm shift. Jane Kinninmont, writing for Haaretz, asserts that the "all new" economic peace approach has been tried before and doesn't work. When the plan emerged, Yehuda Shaul argued that, far from being an 'unconventional approach' that broke with tradition, the proposals were actually remarkably similar to the details set forth both in the Drobles Plan, written for the World Zionist Organization, and published over 40 years earlier, in 1979, entitled Master Plan for the Development of Settlements in Judea and Samaria, 1979–1983, and key elements of the earlier Allon Plan. The aim of the Drobles' plan was to ensure Jewish settlement in the Palestinian territories, while blocking the possibility that a Palestinian state could ever emerge.

Former United States Secretary of State Rex Tillerson has said that, on May 22, 2017, Benjamin Netanyahu showed Donald Trump a fake and "spliced-together" video of Palestinian President Mahmoud Abbas calling for the killing of children. This was at a time when Trump was considering whether Israel was the obstacle to peace. Netanyahu showed Trump the video to change his position in the Israeli-Palestinian conflict.

== Rolling out the plan ==
In late June 2019, the "economic plan" was unveiled at a U.S.-led "Peace to Prosperity" conference in Manama, Bahrain. The Palestinian leadership boycotted the entire event. According to Bess Levin, writing for Vanity Fair, the whole conference was 'panned by experts', citing one who described it as "the Monty Python sketch of Israeli-Palestinian peace initiatives".

In September 2019, Jared Kushner and Jason Greenblatt finalized the "political plan", access to which was restricted to only Kushner, Greenblatt, Friedman and Kushner's former employee and aide Avi Berkowitz. Greenblatt resigned in September 2019, realizing, according to Martin Indyk, that the plan had no future. He was replaced by Berkowitz, a young lawyer who worked for Kushner's companies and whom, like Kushner, was raised as an Orthodox Jew with deep ties to Israel.

The economic portion of the plan, consisting of two pamphlets of 40 and 96 pages each that are filled with financial tables and economic projections, was published by the Trump administration on 22 June 2019. It was presented by Kushner during the workshop in Manama, Bahrain on June 25–26. The political portion of the plan was rolled out on 28 January 2020. The timing of roll-out showed a contrast between the Trump impeachment trial and the Israeli five weeks from the announcement of the plan. The U.S. government insisted that revealing the plan now was not designed to distract from impeachment, but was rather a reaction to political realities in Israel. Amid intense partisanship, Israel has had three elections in less than a year (April 2019 to March 2020), and may yet have a fourth. Prior to the 2020 Israeli legislative election Israel had the April 2019 Israeli legislative election, with Netanyahu facilitating the formation of the Union of the Right-Wing Parties by uniting the Jewish Home party with the far-right Otzma Yehudit party. Otzma is widely characterized as racist and traces its origins to the extremist Kahanist movement. Immediately prior to the September elections, on 10 September 2019, Netanyahu pledged to annex part of the West Bank on the border with Jordan and promised to apply "Israeli sovereignty over the Jordan Valley and northern Dead Sea" if re-elected.

== Key concepts and final status issues ==
The stated purpose of the Trump peace plan was to outline the terms of an agreement, to be signed by both parties, to end the conflict between Israelis and Palestinians and clear all claims made by both parties to the conflict. The authors of the proposal envisage that the achievement of such a solution would endow Palestinians with the right of self-governance while denying them any powers that might constitute a threat to Israel. The successful solution will direct flights between the State of Israel and its neighbors. The Trump administration stated that it would break with the worn paradigms of past approaches to the Israeli–Palestinian peace process, removing two core issues by implementing two measures in 2017 and 2019, that suggested the United States' redefinition of the parameters for definitively resolving the conflict in large part espoused Israeli positions. These were (1) recognizing Jerusalem as Israel's capital on 6 December 2017 and (2) on 18 November 2019 stating that Jewish settlements in the West Bank were consistent with international law. As a visible signal of its break with the past, the United States opened its embassy in the building of the U.S. consulate's compound in Jerusalem's southern neighborhood of Arnona at the 70th anniversary of the establishment of the State of Israel.

Kushner has likened the plan to the Marshall Plan to rebuild Western European economies after World War II. Fifty billion dollars are envisioned for the PA. The Economic Vision's empowerment by "doing tourism" was perceived as challenged by the Israel and Egypt's 12-year blockade of the Hamas-controlled territory, and 52-year-long occupation of the West Bank.

The Palestine Liberation Organization (PLO) accused the United States of trying to sell a "mirage of economic prosperity" that would in reality "only perpetuate the Palestinians' captivity". Hamas leader Ismail Haniyeh criticized the Arab leaders attending the conference, saying "The (Palestinian) people, who have been fighting for one hundred years, did not commission anyone to concede or to bargain. Jerusalem is ours, the land is ours, and everything is ours." Regarding the controversy over cultural heritage of Palestinian people, Kushner said that critics of the Trump peace plan must "divorce [themselves] from all of the history."

The Trump plan was presented as the best option regarding possible future developments by Kushner who stated "The Palestinian leadership have to ask themselves a question: Do they want to have a state? Do they want to have a better life? If they do, we have created a framework for them to have it, and we're going to treat them in a very respectful manner. If they don't, then they're going to screw up another opportunity like they've screwed up every other opportunity that they've ever had in their existence." Kushner said that the peace proposal will not include the phrase "two-state solution", saying "If you say 'two-state', it means one thing to the Israelis, it means one thing to the Palestinians. We said, 'You know, let's just not say it. Let's just say, let's work on the details of what this means.'" A top-ranking Saudi diplomat stated that the plan includes a "clear path leading to complete Palestinian independence." Robert Malley, director of the International Crisis Group and a leading Middle East expert in former U.S. administrations, stated: "Strip away the domestic and Israeli political considerations that determined the timing of the plan's release, and the message to the Palestinians, boiled down to its essence, is: You've lost, get over it."

=== Israel and the proposed annexation ===
The plan itself places no conditions on Israel with regard to proposals to "annex parts of the West Bank". The Jerusalem Post cited a 26 January letter obtained by them in August 2022, "In exchange for Israel implementing these policies and formally adopting detailed territorial plans not inconsistent with the Conceptual Map attached to my Vision – the United States will recognize Israeli sovereignty in those areas of the West Bank that my vision contemplates as being part of Israel." On 29 January 2020, Prime Minister Netanyahu said he was planning to proceed with annexing 30% of the West Bank at a vote on 1 February 2020. The meeting was never scheduled, as the U.S. message shifted on their position on annexation. On 29 January, the U.S. ambassador to Israel stated that before any annexation of the West Bank or the Jordan Valley took place, the Trump administration "wants to form a joint committee with Israel to discuss the issue" and that "it is impossible to know how long this process will take...we need to ensure the annexation matches the map in our plan." The next day, January 30, Kushner said Washington wants Israel to wait until after its 2 March election before making any moves towards settlement annexation in the West Bank.

On 2 February 2020, Netanyahu's cabinet canceled a meeting to vote on the annexation of 30% of the West Bank after receiving mixed signals from the United States. On 4 February 2020, Israeli settler leader David Elhayani, the chairman of the Yesha Council, said "Kushner took a knife and put it in Netanyahu's back." The settler leader said a senior U.S. official told them that if the Palestinians did not agree to the plan within 48 hours, Israel would be permitted to annex more than 30 percent of the West Bank. Responding to Israeli Prime Minister Benjamin Netanyahu announcing on 8 February that his government had begun to draw up maps of land in the occupied West Bank, in accordance with U.S. President Donald Trump's proposed peace plan, Ambassador Friedman indicated that "Any unilateral action in advance of the completion of the committee process endangers the plan and American recognition." On 15 February, the membership of the committee was announced. It includes Friedman, his policy adviser Aryeh Lightstone, and Scott Leith, a National Security Council expert on Israel. Israeli members include Tourism Minister Yariv Levin and Israeli Ambassador Ron Dermer. No deadline for the conclusion of deliberations has been set.

==== Political developments ====
Following inconclusive Israeli elections, a new emergency unity government agreement was concluded on 20 April between the two alliances led by Netanyahu and Benny Gantz, the "Likud bloc" and the "Blue and White bloc", respectively. The agreement included clauses in respect of the contemplated annex of the West Bank:

1. The U.S. must give its full agreement.
2. Netanyahu and Gantz must engage the international community.
3. After 1 July 2020, Netanyahu can bring the plan up for discussion in the Cabinet and/or for a vote in the Knesset

Axios cite a "senior U.S. official" as saying that any Israeli annexations must come "in the context of an offer to the Palestinians to achieve statehood based upon specific terms, conditions, territorial dimensions and generous economic support." and that "We are prepared to recognize Israeli actions to extend Israeli sovereignty over areas of the West Bank in the context of the Government of Israel agreeing to negotiate with the Palestinians along the lines set forth in President Trump's vision."

On April 30, reacting to the agreement, representatives of the United Kingdom, Germany, France, Italy, Spain, Netherlands, Sweden, Belgium, Denmark, Ireland, Finland and the EU envoy registered a formal protest. The envoys also demanded a freeze on government plans to allow construction in the Givat Hamatos neighborhood in East Jerusalem. On 18 May 2020, the EU issued a statement congratulating the new Israeli government but which noted "with grave concern the provision—to be submitted for approval by the Israeli cabinet—on the annexation of parts of occupied Palestinian territories, as stated by the Prime Minister when presenting his government to the Knesset on 17 May and as envisaged in the coalition agreement signed earlier. We strongly urge Israel to refrain from any unilateral decision that would lead to the annexation of any occupied Palestinian territory and would be, as such, contrary to International Law."

At a video meeting of the United Nations Security Council on 20 May 2020, UN Middle East envoy Nickolay Mladenov said that Israel must abandon its threat to annex parts of the occupied West Bank, saying such a plan would be a serious violation of international law that would "close the door to a renewal of negotiations". European Union representatives expressed concern about the intent of the new Israeli government to annex parts of the West Bank and the Jordan Valley, saying it would be a violation of international law while Danny Danon, for Israel, said that "Any decision on the topic of sovereignty will be made solely by the Israeli government with coordination with the American administration."

At a press conference on 9 June 2020, Mohammed Shtayyeh, the Palestinian prime minister, said "We submitted a counter-proposal to the Quartet a few days ago," which proposed the creation of a "sovereign Palestinian state, independent and demilitarised", with "minor modifications of borders where necessary", as well as exchanges of land equal "in size and volume and in value—one to one".

At a video meeting of the United Nations Security Council on 24 June 2020 UN secretary general, António Guterres, called on the Israeli government "to abandon its annexation plans" describing the proposed annex as a "watershed moment" that will constitute a "most serious violation of international law" that if implemented would "grievously harm the prospect of a two-state solution and undercut the possibilities of a renewal of negotiations". The call was reiterated by seven European nations (Belgium, Britain, Estonia, France, Germany, Ireland and Norway) in a joint statement warning that annexation would "severely undermine" prospects for resuming the Middle East peace process and that "Under international law, annexation would have consequences for our close relationship with Israel and would not be recognized by us". Subsequently, repeating his call, Guterres announced that the UN was still unable to convene the Middle East Quartet to discuss the potential annex. For its part the Trump administration are in discussions about the planned annex without reaching any conclusion. U.S. lawmakers are split on party lines with more than 185 House Democrats signing a letter opposing annexation.

On June 29, 2020, it was revealed that Netanyahu's coalition partner Benny Gantz would not accept the proposed July 1, 2020 deadline to start annexing the West Bank. Gantz also announced that he would prefer that the Israeli government deal with the COVID-19 pandemic first. Despite not serving as Prime Minister, it was reported that Gantz's objection cast doubt on when a new deadline could be set. The same day, U.S. sources confirmed that West Bank annexation would not start by the planned July 1 deadline as well.

=== Palestinian statehood ===
The plan puts the Palestinians on probation, establishing a set of conditions they must meet and adopting Netanyahu's view that a shrunken Palestinian entity will be a state in name only; Israel will control of its borders, air space, electro-magnetic spectrum, foreign policy and security; it proposes a State of Palestine with a capital on the outskirts of East Jerusalem which will not be established up to four years into the execution of the plan. The plan would be conditional on Palestinians taking steps to become self-governing. However, the sovereignty the State of Palestine would possess is disputed. Many argue the Trump plan creates a Palestinian state with only limited sovereignty, while others argue the state would not have even limited sovereignty. Israeli Prime Minister Netanyahu said the proposal gives Palestinians a chance to achieve "conditional, limited sovereignty". The Jerusalem Post argues sovereignty of Palestine would be limited as Israel would retain full security control. Israel would also control Palestine's borders and airspace. The Palestinians must:

1. Disarm the governing authority of the Gaza Strip, Hamas, together with Islamic Jihad Movement in Palestine and all Palestinians under their authority;
2. Recognize Israel as a Jewish State;
3. Refrain from any attempt to join any international organization without the consent of the State of Israel;
4. Take no action, and shall dismiss all pending actions, against the State of Israel, the United States and any of their citizens before the International Criminal Court, the International Court of Justice, and all other tribunals;
5. Take no action against any Israeli or United States citizen before Interpol or any non-Israeli or United States (as applicable) legal system;
6. Immediately terminate the paying of "prisoner & martyr payments" (defined as salaries to the families of terrorists serving sentences in Israeli prisons, as well as to the families of deceased terrorists). Jonathan Cook states that this part of the plan would require the Palestinian Authority to strip "welfare payments" for "the families of political prisoners and martyrs killed by the Israeli army" and to develop humanitarian and welfare programs to provide essential services and support to Palestinians in need that are not based upon the commission of terrorist acts. The stated goal was have the Palestinian Authority pass laws regarding militants who have been convicted by Israeli courts of a charge of 'terrorism' in a way that will make those laws consistent with the laws of the United States.

After these and every other step laid out by the Trump plan have been taken successfully, the plan would reach its final stage, consisting in the recognition of the State of Palestine, an entity so defined that Aaron David Miller calls it a 'faux state'. Israel and the United States stated that the following conditions (see: § Recognition Criteria) "must be determined to have occurred by the State of Israel and the United States, jointly". On 29 January 2020, Palestinian President Mahmoud Abbas said Jerusalem was "not for sale; All our rights are not for sale and are not for bargain." Hamas rejected the deal on the grounds that it aspired to "liquidate the Palestinian national project." Thousands of Palestinian protesters held a "day of rage" in the Gaza Strip. On 1 February 2020, Reuters (Cairo) reported that Trump requested to speak to Abbas by phone, but Abbas declined. Trump then wanted to send him a letter, which Abbas also refused. The Palestinian Authority subsequently declared cutting all ties with the United States and Israel, including security relations, although this never took place. On 3 February 2020, lead Palestinian negotiator Saeb Erekat said "What is left to negotiate? When I said these issues must be negotiated between us and Israel directly, Kushner responded by calling me a failed negotiator, unable to negotiate. He negotiated on my behalf because he knows better than I do what is best for me. This is the art of dictation, arrogance, and blackmail."

==== Recognition criteria ====
The Trump plan sets forth criteria that Palestinians must meet before a Palestinian state was allowed to form. Whether Palestinians have met these criteria will be determined by Israel and the United States. If at any time Israel decides the Palestinians are not meeting the criteria, the Trump plan gives Israel the right to retake military control. According to U.S. diplomat Ilan Goldenburg, this would allow Israel to determine when to end the occupation.

The criteria are:

- The Palestinians shall have implemented a governing system with a constitution or another system for establishing the rule of law that provides for freedom of press, free and fair elections, respect for human rights for its citizens, protections for religious freedom and for religious minorities to observe their faith, uniform and fair enforcement of law and contractual rights, due process under law, and an independent judiciary with appropriate legal consequences and punishment established for violations of the law.
- The Palestinians shall have established transparent, independent, and credit-worthy financial institutions capable of engaging in international market transactions in the same manner as financial institutions of western democracies with appropriate governance to prevent corruption and ensure the proper use of such funds, and a legal system to protect investments and to address market-based commercial expectations. The State of Palestine should meet the independent objective criteria to join the International Monetary Fund.
- The Palestinians shall have ended all programs, including school curricula and textbooks, that serve to incite or promote hatred or antagonism towards its neighbors, or which compensate or incentivize criminal or violent activity.
- The Palestinians shall have achieved civilian and law enforcement control over all of its territory and demilitarized its population.
- The Palestinians shall have complied with all the other terms and conditions of this Vision.

=== Status of borders and territory ===
The plan recognizes Palestinian rights to roughly 70% of the West Bank. The plan called for land swaps, but dismissed the idea of "1-to-1 land swaps", arguing Palestinians would not receive 100 percent of pre-1967 territory, but provided for territory that would be "reasonably comparable" to pre-1967 territory. In exchange for Israel annexing parts of the West Bank, the plan raises the possibility of stripping the 350,000 Israeli Arab citizens of 10 towns in the Israel Triangle zone, such as Tayibe, Kafr Qasim and Qalansawe, of their Israeli citizenship by transferring their area to a future state of Palestine. Palestinians would be given parts of the Negev Desert, connected through small land corridors to Gaza. The Trump plan gives Palestinians less territory than previous proposals.

The plan recognizes an Israeli right to the entire Jordan Valley. Israel regards the valley as militarily strategic. Palestinians regard the valley as important for agriculture. The valley also allows Palestinians access to the River Jordan, which irrigates 80,000 hectares of agricultural land in the West Bank; giving Israel the valley would allow it to divert that water for its own use. According to Saree Makdisi, the plan would not allow Palestine to control its water resources.

Within the West Bank, approximately 97% of Palestinians would be incorporated into contiguous Palestinian territory and 97% of Israelis into contiguous Israeli territory. On 3 February 2020, Trump plan raised the possibility that 11 Arab border towns, part of Israel's 21% Arab minority, become relocated [moved to] a future Palestinian state. Residents fear losing their ties to the land. When asked, David Friedman denied that Arab residents in Israel would lose citizenship.

The implementation of the plan was conditional, being subject to the "Gaza Criteria" and would only proceed if the governance of the Gaza Strip, at present administered by Hamas, were transferred back either to the Palestinian Authority or another Palestinian entity Israel approves of. The technical feasibility of such a transformation of Gaza governance was not clear. According to these conditions, Hamas, the PIJ, and all other militias and organizations in Gaza which Israel classifies as "terrorist" would have to be disarmed. Gaza would be fully demilitarized. Hamas itself would be required to commit itself to making peace with the State of Israel by adopting the Quartet Principles, which include unambiguously and explicitly recognizing the State of Israel, committing to nonviolence, and accepting previous agreements and obligations between the parties.

=== Defense and border regime ===
The State of Palestine shall be fully demilitarized and remain as so.

The State of Israel will be responsible for security at all international crossings into the State of Palestine. The State of Israel will continue to maintain control over the airspace and the electromagnetic spectrum, the Israeli Navy will have the right to block prohibited weapons and weapon-making materials from entering the State of Palestine.

The State of Palestine will not have the right to forge intelligence or security agreements with any state or organization that adversely affect the State of Israel's security, as determined by the State of Israel.

=== Status of Jerusalem, Palestinian capital and Holy Sites ===
The plan affirms Israel has a right to the entirety of "undivided Jerusalem", recognizing it as Israel's capital.

The plan does accept a Palestinian capital for a future State of Palestine to be located outside, and east and north of, the Israeli West Bank barrier, in that part of East Jerusalem encompassing Kafr 'Aqab, and the eastern refugee camp of Shuafat and Abu Dis. Martin Indyk described the Palestinian portion as "only a sliver of East Jerusalem". It would bear whatever name Palestinians decide to call it, perhaps al Quds. According to François Dubuisson, designating such a site as Jerusalem involves a 'semantic game', a fragmented entity across several neighborhoods that are miles apart from each other, separated by Israeli communities and major roads, and share little in common. Abu Dis is variously described as a 'decrepit, lawless enclave' or a grim neighbourhood, with 'a single main street and higgledy-piggledy alleys shooting off at strange angles' abutting a hulking concrete separation barrier, on the other side of which lies Jerusalem and its distant Holy Sites. Shuafat refugee camp has been described as a 'gang-ridden slum'.

The plan puts the Haram al Sharif/Temple Mount, including Al-Aqsa mosque, under Israeli sovereignty. While in one part it states that the status quo there will be maintained, elsewhere it appears to envisage major changes to the status quo by permitting non-Muslims, including Jews and Christians, to pray there. The plan rejects Palestinian claims to Haram al-Sharif, instead keeping it under Jordanian custodianship. The plans gives Israel the task of safeguarding the Holy Sites and guaranteeing freedom of worship.

In February 2020, it was announced that the land Trump's plan slates in Atarot for a special world-class tourist zone in the future Palestinian state for Muslim tourists to Jerusalem would be earmarked for a new Israeli settlement spanning 310 acres—all of the remaining land between the West Bank Barrier and Atarot's Industrial zone—with a projected 6,000 to 9,000 housing units. Private individuals owning parts of the area are predominantly Palestinians, but the plan seemingly foresees relocating areas without seeking the owners' consent. It would be the first Jewish settlement in East Jerusalem since 1991, when Har Homa was established.

=== Status of refugees ===
Under the Trump plan, there would be no right of return for Palestinian refugees from the wars of 1948 and 1967 into Israel. The return of any Palestinian refugees to the State of Palestine would be subject to Israel's giving its approval. Were the deal signed, the assistance of UNRWA to the Palestinian population would be terminated.

In the two decades that followed Israel's founding, some 800,000 Jews left the Arab World (300,000 in the very first few years), many as the result of hostilities and persecution; the majority of these immigrated to Israel. Some view the Jewish exodus from Arab and Muslim countries as analogous to the 1948 Palestinian expulsion and flight, emphasizing "push factors" like discrimination and violence, while other emphasize "pull factors" and consider them willing immigrants. (Note: The plan document, while noting the issue of Jewish refugees, stipulates that a "just solution for these Jewish refugees should be implemented through an appropriate international mechanism separate from the Israel-Palestinian Peace Agreement.")

=== Economy ===
The plan proposes a $50 billion investment fund for 179 infrastructure and business projects, to be administered by a "multilateral development bank", with investments protected by "accountability, transparency, anti-corruption, and conditionality safeguards". The administration envisions the plan being funded mostly by Arab states and wealthy private investors. Spending was divided into $26 billion in loans, $13.5 billion in grants, and $11 billion in private investment. The majority of the $50 billion would be spent in the West Bank and Gaza, with $9 billion to be spent in Egypt, $7 billion in Jordan, and $6.3 billion in Lebanon. The proposal includes a number of specific projects, including construction of a travel corridor that would cross Israel to link the West Bank and Gaza with a highway and possibly a rail line, vast expansion of border crossings, power plant upgrades, infrastructure improvements to boost tourism, career counseling and job placement service, re-building and modernizing Palestinian hospitals and health clinics, upgrading cargo terminals and building special access roads to reduce the time and costs of cross-border trade and travel, creation of a modern database to register land ownership, improving the potable water supply and waste water treatment, and establishing a new Palestinian university in the global top 150.

The plan advocates a free market including greater protection of property rights and a "pro-growth tax structure".

The plan's stated goals include creating more than a million jobs, more than doubling the Palestinian GDP, and cutting the poverty rate by 50%. It also aims to bring down the unemployment from 31% down to single digits, and to increase Palestinian exports as a percentage of GDP from 17% to 40%. The plan also aims to increase female labor force participation rate from 20% to 35%, reduce infant mortality from 18 to 9 per 1,000 births, and increase average life expectancy from 74 to 80 years.

=== Anti-terrorism apparatus ===
The State of Palestine's security criteria has to be acceptable to the State of Israel; not (less) stringent than the metrics used by either Jordan or Egypt (whichever is stricter) with respect shall be obeyed. The State of Palestine's counterterrorism system must encompass all elements of counterterrorism.

=== Status of prisoners ===
Israel would undertake to release Palestinian prisoners and detainees held under administrative detention in Israeli prisons. The proposal states that all released prisoners would assume citizenship in a future State of Palestine. At the same time, Israel states that it would not release prisoners falling in any one of the following categories:

1. Those convicted of murder or attempted murder in Israeli courts.
2. Those convicted of conspiracy to commit murder ("terrorists"), according to Israeli courts.
3. Anyone classified under 1 and 2, who may happen to hold Israeli citizenship.

== Developments at the United Nations ==
Mahmoud Abbas at the United Nations Security Council in February 2020, describing the Trump plan as "Swiss Cheese"

- United Nations reaffirmed its commitment to a two-state solution based on the boundaries pre-existing the 1967 Six-Day War. The UN secretary general, António Guterres, stated the only plan he could accept was one that respected UN resolutions and international law. On 6 February, Kushner gave a closed doors briefing on the proposals to UNSC envoys and followed up with a briefing to journalists afterwards. Abbas attended the UN on 11 February to try to get support for a resolution being circulated condemning the proposed annexation; reportedly lacking votes, Abbas pulled the request. Any such resolution was nevertheless expected to attract a U.S. veto. The United States had proposed a series of amendments to the draft resolution that could come for a vote at the session attended by Abbas. In proposals seen by AFP, the United States would significantly alter the text to remove references to 1967 lines being the basis of peace, cut out a line stating that Jewish settlements built in the West Bank since 1967 are illegal and eliminate language that equated East Jerusalem with the occupied West Bank. Haaretz confirmed that the plan would be discussed at the security council session (unusually being opened by the Secretary-General) and that there would be no vote on the draft resolution. The Palestinians have denied that the resolution has been withdrawn, that the draft resolution is still being circulated and discussed and that the resolution has not yet been put in "blue" (the final form for a vote).
- After the security council meeting, the resolution remains in the pipeline according to Indonesia, one of its sponsors. Abbas' criticisms (he described the proposed state as "Swiss cheese") were echoed by most members of the Council while Abbas proposal for an international peace conference drew some support as many members seemed to agree that the parties should use this moment to restart negotiations but the next steps remain unclear.
- At a Security Council held by videoconference on 30 March 2020, UN Special Coordinator for the Middle East Peace Process Nickolay Mladenov said that West Bank annexation would make it impossible to renew Israeli-Palestinian peace talks and would destroy any possibility of a two-state resolution to the conflict and dismissed any peace plan that does not comply with past international understandings that a two-state resolution to the conflict must be based on the pre-1967 lines.
- Following the signing of a governing coalition agreement in Israel that includes a clause to advance plans to annex parts of the West Bank, including Israeli settlements, starting 1 July, Nickolay Mladenov, briefing the UNSC on 23 April, said that annexation would "constitute a serious violation of international law, deal a devastating blow to the two-state solution, close the door to a renewal of negotiations, and threaten efforts to advance regional peace".

== International reactions ==
=== Countries ===
- Bahrain's foreign ministry said in a statement "Bahrain supports all efforts toward achieving a just and comprehensive solution on the Palestinian issue," and thanked the United States for its work.
- China's Foreign ministry said that United Nations resolutions, the two-state solution, the principle of land for peace and other internationally backed measures form the basis for resolving the Israeli–Palestinian conflict.
- Egypt's Foreign Ministry issued a statement that Egypt recognizes the importance of considering the U.S. administration's initiative from the perspective of the importance of achieving the resolution of the Palestinian issue, thus restoring to the Palestinian people their full legitimate rights through the establishment of a sovereign independent state in the Palestinian occupied territories in accordance with international legitimacy and resolutions and that "Egypt calls on the two relevant parties to undertake a careful and thorough consideration of the U.S. vision to achieve peace and open channels of dialogue, under U.S. auspices, for the resumption of negotiations."
- France's Foreign Ministry initially said in a statement "France welcomes President Trump's efforts and will study closely the peace programme he has presented." On 30 January, President Macron said "I believe in two sovereignties" when asked by Le Figaro newspaper whether he believed in two states and suggested the plan could struggle to get off the ground; he said "You need to be two to make peace. You can't get there with just one side."
- Iran's Foreign Minister Javad Zarif said that the "so-called 'Vision for Peace' is simply the dream project of a bankruptcy-ridden real estate developer", and referred to it as a "nightmare for the region and the world".
- Jordan expressed open opposition to the plan: its Foreign Ministry said that the only path to a comprehensive and lasting Middle East peace was the establishment of an independent Palestinian state based on land captured by Israel in a 1967 war, and with East Jerusalem as its capital. On 3 March 2020, Jordan's Prime Minister said about the plan "Is the world willing to accept this? Do we realize where we're pushing Israel, Palestine, the region and the world?" and warned that Jordan's peace treaty with Israel was potentially at risk.
- Kuwait's parliament had decided to boycott the Bahrain conference, the only Gulf state to do so. In response, Kuwait's Foreign Minister stated that "... we accept what our Palestinian brothers accept." The Kuwaiti government appointed its first ambassador to Palestine shortly thereafter. After the announcement of the complete plan, the foreign ministry showed appreciation towards U.S. efforts for peace, but added that a complete and fair solution is only possible if it follows international community terms and decisions, mainly "... an independent and sovereign state on the June 4, 1967 border with its capital in East Jerusalem."
- Morocco's Foreign Ministry stated that Morocco "appreciates" the U.S. plan, adding that acceptance by the parties is "fundamental to the implementation and sustainability of the plan".
- Qatar's Foreign Ministry stated that 'Qatar affirms its readiness to provide the required support for any endeavors within these foundations to resolve the Palestinian issue. ... Peace cannot be sustainable unless the rights of the Palestinian people to establish an independent and sovereign state on the 1967 borders, including East Jerusalem, and to return to their lands are safeguarded.'
- Russia: In an initial official response, presidential spokesman Dmitry Peskov raised doubts about the plan noting "It's plain enough that some of this plan's provisions do not fully correspond to the relevant resolutions by the UN Security Council" and noting the opposition of the Palestinians and Arab states.
- Saudi Arabia's Foreign Ministry said in a statement, "The Kingdom appreciate the efforts of President Trump's Administration to develop a comprehensive peace plan between the Palestinian and Israeli sides; and encourages the start of direct peace negotiation between the Palestinian and Israeli sides, under the auspices of the United States." King Salman has repeatedly stated Saudi Arabia will not support any settlement that fails to create an independent Palestinian state with East Jerusalem as its capital.
- Turkey's Foreign Ministry criticized the plan and said it was aimed at "stealing Palestinian lands".
- United Arab Emirates: The ambassador issued a statement that the plan offers an important starting point for a return to negotiations within a U.S.-led international framework.
- United Kingdom: Foreign Secretary Dominic Raab initially issued a statement cautiously welcoming the release of U.S. proposals for peace between Israelis and Palestinians. Subsequently, on 31 January, Raab, in response to talk of annexation, warned against any unilateral moves.

=== Supranational organizations ===
- Arab League: On 1 February, the Arab League issued a unanimous rejection of the plan. In a joint communique, officials from the 22 member states said the deal would not lead to a just peace between both sides, and the league would not cooperate with the United States to implement it. According to Haaretz, an Arab diplomat explained that the United States did not disclose the full details of its Mideast peace plan to Arab states before its release, which is why representatives of three Arab countries attended the event unveiling it and "when they got into the minute details of the plan, we understood that there is no Palestinian state in practice and there is no capital in East Jerusalem, and more importantly, that there is an attempt to divide al-Aqsa Mosque" and "... so ultimately all the foreign ministers fell in line with the position opposing the Trump plan, and reiterated their commitment to the Arab Peace Initiative."
- European Union: On 4 February 2020, Josep Borrell, High Representative for Foreign Affairs and Security Policy and vice-president of the European Commission in a toughening of its initial response, said that the plan broke with "internationally agreed parameters" and "Steps towards annexation, if implemented, could not pass unchallenged." Commenting "We can't not react to something [annexation] that, from our point of view, is against international law," EU foreign affairs chief Josep Borrell said that the topic would be on the agenda of the next EU foreign affairs ministers' meeting in March, which would produce a common EU position on the subject. The Luxembourg foreign minister, Jean Asselborn, had hosted a private dinner on 16 February with eight other EU foreign ministers from Belgium, Finland, France, Ireland, Malta, Spain, Slovenia, and Sweden on the subject. Portugal also sent its secretary of state to the event.

== Other reactions ==
On 3 February 2020, the Organisation of Islamic Cooperation, rejected the plan and "calls on all member states not to engage with this plan or to cooperate with the U.S. administration in implementing it in any form."

According to Christianity Today, the reaction in the Christian world was mixed. The plan was criticised by many Middle Eastern Christians, including by Christians at Nazareth Evangelical College, Gaza Baptist Church, Presbyterian Church of Aleppo and the Arab Baptist Theological Seminary in Beirut. The plan was praised by Christians at Christians United for Israel and Beeson Divinity School in Alabama.

The reaction among American Jewish groups was mixed: J Street criticised the plan while AIPAC praised it. A number of conditions (see: § Recognition Criteria) have been denounced as unachievable.

On 23 February 2020, Pope Francis said at a meeting of bishops from all countries in the Mediterranean basin "Nor can we overlook the still unresolved conflict between Israelis and Palestinians, with the danger of inequitable solutions and, hence, a prelude to new crises."

In an open letter published by The Guardian, fifty former European prime ministers and foreign ministers condemned the plan, saying it would create an apartheid-like situation in occupied Palestinian territory. According to Nathan Thrall, Middle East analyst for the International Crisis Group, both Clinton's and the subsequent Trump plan confine a Palestinian majority to an area less than a quarter of Mandate Palestine. For Rashid Khalidi, rather than being a new deal for the 21st century, Trump's plan follows a much older colonial pattern set long ago by Great Britain and pursued by the United States.

=== Naming ===
The peace plan was called by its proponents "the deal of the century", phrasing used by Prime Minister Benjamin Netanyahu in a joint press conference with Donald Trump announcing the plan. Critics of the proposal were quick to offer variants of the phrase. The Palestinian President Mahmoud Abbas reacted immediately with a riposte that it was the "slap of the century". The secretary general of the Palestine Liberation Organization Saeb Erekat tweeted that it would be known as the "fraud of the century". The Economist called it the "steal of the century". In the aftermath of Israel walking back its initial pledge of "immediate annexation", a Haaretz commentator wrote of the "joke of the century".

== See also ==
- Abraham Accords
- Israel–United Arab Emirates normalization agreement
- Bahrain–Israel normalization agreement
- Israel–Sudan normalization agreement
- Israel–Morocco normalization agreement

== Bibliography ==
- White House Staff (2020). Peace to Prosperity (PDF) (Report). The White House. The content of the website is in the public domain or licensed under Creative Commons Attribution license. "Copyright Policy". White House. January 16, 2017. Archived from the original on January 24, 2017.
