= Atef Tarawneh =

Jordanian politician

- عاطف الطراونة
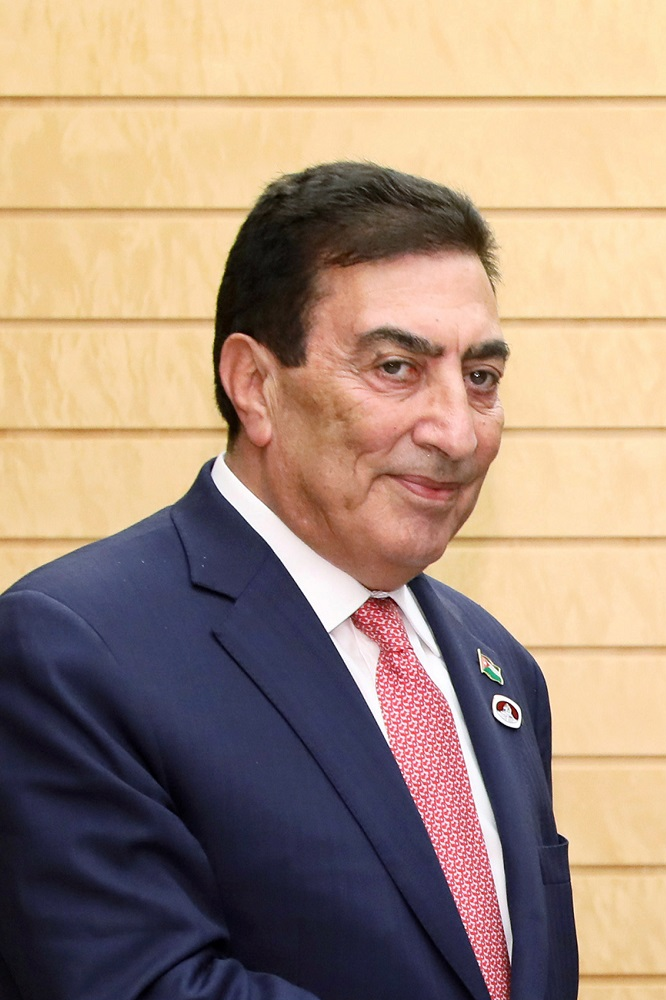
- Tarawneh in 2019

Speaker of the House of Representatives
- In office 3 November 2013 – 10 December 2020
- Monarch: Abdullah II
- Preceded by: Saad Hayel Srour
- Succeeded by: Abdelmonem Al-Odat

Former Member of the House of Representatives for the National List
- Incumbent
- Assumed office 23 January 2013

Personal details
- Born: 1 January 1954 (age 72) Khalidiyah
- Party: Watan/Homeland
- Children: 4

Atef Tarawneh (born 1 January 1954) is a Jordanian politician who has been the Speaker of Jordan's House of Representatives from 3 November 2013 to 10 December 2020. He was a member of the House of Representatives from 2003 to 2020.

== Early life ==
Tarawneh was born in Khalidiyah, Karak Governorate in 1954. He went to primary school in Khalidiyah and Moab. He followed his secondary education in Al-Karak. He studied civil engineering in Greece. From 1981 to 1983 he worked as an engineer in Saudi Arabia. Tarawneh then returned to Jordan and worked as engineering director of the municipalities of Ma'an, Zarqa and Balqa before having that position in Amman from 1984 to 1994. Tarawneh then turned to private business.

== Political career ==
Tarawneh was first elected in the 2003 Jordanian general election. He was subsequently part of the 14th, 15th, and 16th Parliaments, serving in the House of Representatives. He also served as Deputy Speaker of the House at one point. In February 2011, while he was Deputy Speaker, he criticized the government's decision to strip Jordanian citizenship from some Jordanians with Palestinian origin on claims that it supported the Palestinian people and their goal of a state. The idea behind the government policy was said to be to protect the Palestinian identity. Tarawneh revealed that several high-ranking Palestinian leaders and negotiators had received Jordanian citizenship during the same period. He claimed that the policy was contradictory and that it undermined national unity.

Tarawneh led the party Nation List in the Jordanian general election in 2013. The list comprised native Jordanians and Jordanians of Palestinian descent. The list, referred to as Watan or Homeland, received 94682 votes in the election and thereby earned two seats, which went to Tarawneh and Khamis Atiyeh.

Tarawneh ran in the November 2013 Speaker elections, which were held at the start of the regular session of the 17th parliament. On 20 October, out of a total of six candidates, his main competitor was seen as incumbent Speaker Saad Hayel Srour. Tarawneh had the support of his Homeland bloc in parliament, consisting of 20 Representatives, and he could count on another 39 votes by forming a coalition with two other blocs. On 3 November the first round of voting started, with only three candidates remaining. Tarawneh gained 60 votes, Abdul Karim Dughmi gained 43 votes and Srour gained 37 votes. In the second round Tarawneh was to compete against Dughmi, Dughmi however withdrew his candidacy just before the start of the voting. Tarawneh was therefore declared winner.

He was re-elected as Speaker on 2 November 2014. And once more on 15 November 2015. His fourth re-election took place on 7 November 2016. On 14 October 2018 he was re-elected for a fifth term.

On February 8, 2020, during an extraordinary meeting of the Arab Inter-Parliamentary Union in Amman, Atef Tarawneh said Palestinians will only accept a viable solution that envisages a Palestinian statehood on the June 4 border with its capital in Jerusalem. He warned that the US Middle East peace plan “confiscates the Palestinian people’s rights and undermines the very foundations on which relevant international legitimacy resolutions were based”.

In June 2020 two of his brothers were being investigated for abuse of power and corruption charges. Tarawneh subsequently stated that the government was targeting him and his family. 85 members of the House condemned Tarawneh's statement.

== Personal life ==
He is married and has four children.
