= Saad Hayel Srour =

Jordanian politician, Speaker of the House (born 1947)

Speaker of the House of Representatives
- In office 1995–1998
- Monarch: Hussein of Jordan
- Preceded by: Taher al-Masri
- Succeeded by: Abdul Hadi al-Majali
- In office 16 July 2003 – 2007
- Monarch: Abdullah II of Jordan
- Preceded by: Abdul Hadi al-Majali
- Succeeded by: Abdul Hadi al-Majali
- In office 10 February 2013 – 3 November 2013
- Monarch: Abdullah II of Jordan
- Preceded by: Abdul Karim al-Doghmi
- Succeeded by: Atef Tarawneh

Interior Minister
- In office 24 November 2010 – 2 July 2011
- Monarch: Abdullah II of Jordan
- Prime Minister: Samir Rifai; Marouf al-Bakhit
- Preceded by: Nayef Qadi
- Succeeded by: Mazen Saket

Deputy Prime Minister
- In office 24 November 2010 – 2 July 2011
- Monarch: Abdullah II of Jordan
- Prime Minister: Samir Rifai; Marouf al-Bakhit

Member of the House of Representatives for Northern Badia
- In office 23 January 2013 – 2016

Personal details
- Born: 1947 (age 78–79) Umm el-Jimal, Jordan

Saad Hayel Srour (born 1947) is a Jordanian politician. After entering the House of Representatives during the 11th Parliament he held stints as Minister of Water and Irrigation and later Housing and Works during the early 1990s. He served terms as Speaker of the House of Representatives during the 12th, 13th, 14th, 15th and 17th Parliaments. Between November 2010 and July 2011 he was Deputy Prime Minister and Interior Minister.

== Life ==
Srour was born in 1947 in Umm el-Jimal. He is from a Bedouin family. He obtained a bachelor in civil engineering from the University of Riyadh in Saudi Arabia. Srour first entered the House of Representatives during the 11th Parliament. On 1 January 1991 he was named Minister of Water and Irrigation in a cabinet reshuffle by Prime Minister Mudar Badran. By November 1992 this had changed to Minister of Housing and Works. Srour later served in the 12th, 13th, 14th, 15th and 17 Parliaments. He was first elected the Speaker of the House of Representatives of Jordan in 1995. Srour subsequently was Speaker of the House for several sessions during the 12th, 13th, 14th and 15th Parliaments. On 16 July 2003 he won the election for Speaker against Abdul Hadi al-Majali with 65 against 40 votes. Srour was not successful in gaining a seat during the 2010 Jordanian general election for the 16th Parliament.

On 24 November 2010 Srour joined the government of Samir Rifai as Deputy Prime Minister and Interior Minister, replacing Nayef Qadi in a cabinet reshuffle. He continued as Interior Minister in the government of Marouf al-Bakhit which was installed on 9 February 2011. He was made Deputy Prime Minister in al-Bakhit's cabinet. He lost both positions in a cabinet reshuffle on 2 July 2011, after he received criticism from protesters for excessive police-violence against demonstrators in the 2011 Jordanian protests and for letting a for corruption jailed businessman leave the country for medical treatment. He was replaced by Mazen Saket.

After being elected for Northern Badia in the 2013 Jordanian general election, Srour was also elected Speaker of the House of Representatives on 10 February 2013 for a term concluding in November 2013, when a new ordinary session of legislation was scheduled to start. A total of eight Representatives put themselves up for election as speaker, with four of them withdrawing before the voting started. Of the total number of 150 Representatives only 146 were able to vote, as two were absent, one had resigned and one had died. In the first round of voting Srour gained 50 votes, Mohammad Al Haj of the Islamic Centre Party gained 54, Mustafa Shneikat gained 36, and Mahmoud Kharabsheh gained 5 votes. In the second round in which Srour competed against Al Haj, Srour gained 80 votes and Al Haj 62, Srour was therefore declared winner.

Srour ran as well for the November 2013 elections for Speaker, at the opening of the regular session of parliament. On 30 October 2013 the list of candidates was down to five candidates, with deputies seeing Srour and Atef Tarawneh as the strongest candidates. However, after the first round of voting on 3 November 2013 the candidates that passed to the second round were Tarawneh and Abdul Karim al-Doghmi. al-Doghmi withdrew his candidacy before the second round of voting, making Tarawneh the new Speaker of the House. Srour lost his seat in the House of Representatives in the 2016 Jordanian general election.

On 4 February 2019 Srour was named adviser for tribal affairs to King Abdullah II of Jordan.

== Political positions ==
Srour is seen as a conservative and a supporter of the monarchy of Jordan.
