= John N. Clarke =

Canadian author and political advisor

Head of Mission in the Office of the Quartet
- Incumbent
- Assumed office w.e.f. 17 January 2018
- Preceded by: Kito de Boer

Personal details
- Born: 3 March 1972 (age 54)

John N. Clarke (born 3 March 1972) is a senior United Nations (UN) official currently serving as Head of Mission of the Office of the Quartet. He has previously served in a variety of humanitarian and recovery roles with the United Nations as well as serving as a Policy Advisor to Canada's then Minister of Foreign Affairs, the Hon. Lloyd Axworthy. He continues to publish on a variety of academic subjects and serves as the Chair of the Clarke Education Foundation which works to enable women's higher education in the developing world by supporting a number of university scholarships.

== Early life and education ==
Clarke is the son of Professor John Clarke, originally from Belfast, Northern Ireland and the late Vilma Nathaniel Clarke originally from Quetta, Pakistan. He was raised and educated in Ottawa, Canada and received a B.A. (Honours) in Philosophy and Politics from the University of Western Ontario (Huron College). He completed and an MPhil (Clare Hall) and PhD (Peterhouse) at Cambridge University, where he studied between 1995 and 1999 and later held a Post-doctoral Fellowship at Yale University.

== Career ==
From 1999 to 2000, Clarke served as Policy Advisor to then Canadian Minister of Foreign Affairs, the Hon. Lloyd Axworthy. He then joined the United Nations with which he has served in a variety of relief, recovery and political roles. In March 2016 he joined the Office of the Quartet (OQ) serving as Deputy Head of Mission and in July 2017, as Acting Head of Mission. On 17 January 2018, the Middle East Quartet Envoys (Russia, the United States, the European Union and the United Nations appointed him as the new Head of Mission of the OQ.The role of the OQ is to increase Palestinian economic and institutional development and empowerment, as a support towards achieving a two-state solution. In the event of a resumption of final status negotiations the OQ would support Quartet members in their efforts to realize a successful outcome.

== Publications ==
British Media and Rwandan Genocide (author)

Bridging the Political and Global Governance Gap: A Two-step Approach to Canadian Foreign Policy, Canadian Foreign Policy, ISSN 1192-6422, Vol. 12, No. 2 (Fall 2005), 47-64

Global Governance in the Twenty-first Century (co-editor)

== Selected articles ==
- Nathaniel Clarke, Joh. "Transitional coordination in Sudan: Lessons from the United Nations Resident Coordinator's Office". Disasters: The Journal of Disaster Studies, Policy and Management. 37 (3). doi:1 0.1111/disa.12008.
- Closing the Political and Global Governance Gap: A Two Step Approach to Canadian Foreign Policy Canadian Foreign Policy. Winter 2006, Volume 12, Number 2.
- Early Warning Analysis for Humanitarian Preparedness and Conflict Prevention, Civil Wars. Volume 7, Number 1, Spring 2005, pp. 71–97.
- Revisiting the New Interventionism, Peace Review. (Vol. 14, No. 1, March 2002).
- Ethics and Humanitarian Intervention, Global Society: Journal of Interdisciplinary International Relations. Volume 13, No.4, October 1999, pp. 489–510.
