= Nayef Saoud Faris Al Kadi =

Jordanian diplomat

Nayif al Qadi
- نايف سعود فارس القاضي

Jordanian Ambassador to Qatar of Jordan to Qatar
- In office 1989–1993
- Succeeded by: Zahi Mohammad Al Samadi

Jordanian Ambassador to Egypt of Jordan to Egypt
- In office 1993–1994.
- Preceded by: Hazem Nuseibeh
- Succeeded by: Hani Al-Mulki

Jordanian Minister of Interior
- In office 1998–2000
- Preceded by: Salameh Hammad
- Succeeded by: Samir Habashneh

Jordanian Minister of Interior Deputy Prime Minister
- In office 2009–2009
- Preceded by: Eid Al-Fayez
- Succeeded by: Saad Hayel Srour

Personal details
- Born: 1944 (age 81–82) Hawsha
- Spouse: Married
- Children: 3
- Parent: prominent sheikh from the Bani Khaled tribe. (father)
- Education: 1969 Bachelor of Arts in Political science from Baghdad University.

Nayef Saoud Faris Al Kadi (born 1944) is a retired Jordanian Ambassador he was Deputy Prime Minister and Minister of Interior.

== Career ==
- In 1965 he joined the Jordanian Diplomatic Service.
- From 1969 to 1973 he was deputy chief of the mission in Baghdad (Iraq).
- From 1970 to 1974 he was Chargé d'affaires in Baghdad (Iraq).
- From 1973 to 1980 he was Consul in London.
- From 1980 to 1983 he was Deputy Vice-Representative to the Arab League.
- From 1983 to 1984 he was Chargé d'affaires in Beirut.
- From 1984 to 1989 he was Counselor at the Jordanian Embassy in London.
- From 1989 to 1993 he was Ambassador in Doha (Qatar).
- From 1993 to 1994 he was Ambassador in Cairo (Egypt) and Permanent Representative to the Arab League.
- He was part of the delegation that negotiated the Jordanian-Israeli peace treaty.
- From 1997 to 2003 he was appointed Senator to the upper house of parliament.
- From 1998 to 2000 he was Deputy Prime Minister and Minister of Interior.
- In 1999 he oversaw the closure of HAMAS's Jordan office and the deportation of several Hamas members.
- In 2009 he was a Deputy Prime Minister and again Jordanian Minister of Interior.
