= Ahmed Safadi =

Jordanian politician

Ahmed Muhammad Al-Safadi is a Jordanian independent politician who was elected Speaker of the House of Representatives on 15 November 2022.
