= List of speakers of the House of Representatives of Jordan =

Speaker of the House of Representatives of Jordan is the presiding officer of House of Representatives (Jordan).

Members of the House of Representatives elect a speaker for one year at the beginning of each session. The Speaker remains in office up to the beginning of the next session, and can be re-elected.

Name	Took office	Left office
Hashim Kheir	1947	1948
Abdul-Qadir al-Tal	1948	1950
Omar Mattar	1950	1951
Abdullah Khulaib	1951	1952
Hikmat Al Masri	1952	1953
Abdul-Haleem al-Nimer	1953	1954
Ahmed Abdul Karim Tarawneh	1954	1956
Hikmat Al Masri	1956	1957
Mustafa Khalifa al-Awamleh	1957	1962
Salah Toukan	1962	1963
Akef Al-Fayez	1963	1966
Kassim al-Rimawi	1967	1970
Kamel Arekat	1970	1984
Akef Al-Fayez	1984	1988
Suleiman A'rar	1989	1990
Abdul-Latif Arabiat	1990	1993
Taher al-Masri	1993	1995
Saad Hayel Srour	1995	1998
Abdul Hadi al-Majali	1998	2003
Saad Hayel Srour	16 July 2003	2007
Abdulhadi al-Majali	2 December 2007	2010
Faisal al-Fayez	2010	2011
Abdul Karim al-Doghmi	2011	2013
Saad Hayel Srour	10 February 2013	3 November 2013
Atef Tarawneh	3 November 2013	10 December 2020
Abdelmonem Al-Odat	10 December 2020	15 November 2021
Abdel-Karim Deghmi	15 November 2021	15 November 2022
Ahmed Safadi	15 November 2022	26 October 2025
Mazed al-Qadi	26 October 2025	

== See also ==
- List of speakers of the Chamber of Deputies of Jordan
- Parliament of Jordan
