= Abu Dis Waste Disposal Site =

The Abu Dis waste disposal site was constructed in Abu Dis in the 1980s, in accordance with the 1987 Solid Waste Disposal Master Plan for Judea and Samaria. It was planned to operate for 20 years. The site is located between Abu Dis and Ayzrya on the eastern side of the separation barrier. It lies between Israeli settlements: Ma’ale Adummim and Qedar. The site is in "Area C", an area under the Oslo Accords, over which Israel has complete authority.

Abu Dis is a Palestinian town in the Jerusalem Governorate of Palestine bordering Jerusalem. Since the 1995 Interim Agreement on the West Bank and the Gaza Strip, Abu Dis has been part of "Area B", under joint Israeli and Palestinian control. According to the Palestinian Central Bureau of Statistics (PCBS) census, Abu Dis had a population of 10,782 in 2007.

While the Abu Dis landfill serves both Israel and Palestine, a majority of the waste originates in Israeli cities and settlements. Jerusalem, including East Jerusalem, constitutes for 90% of the waste. A small percentage of the waste comes from Israeli settlements within Palestine, and Palestinian communities contribute 6% of the waste.

== Costs and Restriction ==
Two factors are prohibiting Palestinian access to the site: the landfill levy, and restricted access.

=== The Landfill Levy ===
There is a levy imposed on both Palestinian and Israeli governments for use of the Abu Dis disposal site. However, the economy of Israel is vastly different from that of Palestine (West Bank). For instance, the GDP of the West Bank per capita, in 2008, was $1485.30 while the GDP of Israel per capita, in 2008, was $28,291.90.

=== Restricted Access ===
Palestinians are legally allowed to dispose of their waste at the site; however, Palestinian access to the site is restricted in other ways. Local councils face financial strains paying levies, which means they often cannot enter the site legally. Also, Israeli security restrictions during times of conflict prohibit Palestinians from reaching the site.

== Environmental Damage and Health Risks ==
The Abu Dis waste disposal site is located above a mountain aquifer. Dissolving limestone above the aquifer poses a risk of polluting the groundwater. The acidic elements in the water, especially leachate, are dangerously polluting a valuable source of water. The site is considered to be an "unsanitary waste dumpsite" because of the leachate leaking into the aquifer and affecting freshwater used by both the Israeli and Palestinian sides.

Leachate collecting tanks are visible at the site; however, there is not sufficient information on the efficacy of the tanks in preventing the toxin seepage in the groundwater. Also, the location of these leachate tanks are exposed and poorly maintained.

Burning of waste is internationally unacceptable because it emits gases that contain toxins such as ammonia and hydrogen sulphate. The accumulation of waste in the site creates an unbearable stench that is carried in the wind and affecting Bedouin communities living nearby. Also, there is a risk of methane exploding since the site is poorly managed, and there are concerns that severe environmental risks are endangering human lives in the region.

== Legal Framework ==
=== International Law ===
According to International Humanitarian Law (IHL), the expropriation of land within occupied territories can only occur due to military necessities for the benefit of the local population. The 1907 Hague Regulations state that the property of the occupied state must not be seized or destroyed unless "imperatively demanded by the necessities of war". Article 55 of the Hague Regulations states that the properties of the occupied territory must be "safeguarded" and the occupying power can act only as "administrator". Article 147 of the Geneva Convention also affirms that "extensive destruction and appropriation of property, not justified by military necessity and carried out unlawfully and wantonly" is to be considered a breach of the convention. These provisions require the occupying power to preserve the natural environment of the occupied territories and to protect it from degradation. They are affirmed both by the Rio Declaration, which notes that the States are obliged to ensure that no damage is caused to the environment of other States that fall under their jurisdiction or control, and by The Basel Convention, which requires that waste exported to another State is "managed in an environmentally sound manner" and that the quantity of waste exported is "reduced to the minimum consistent with the environmentally sound and efficient management of such wastes". The Convention emphasises the need to "protect human health and the environment against effects which may result from such movement [of waste]."

=== Oslo Accords ===
The Oslo I (1993) and Oslo II (1995) Accords between the Israeli Government and the Palestinian Liberation Organisation (PLO) laid out provisions for the two Parties' cooperation and communication on environmental projects. According of Article 12 of the agreement, both sides should establish an Environmental Experts Committee to ensure "environmental cooperation and understandings". This Joint Israeli-Palestinian committee would work together in implementing regulations and requiring an environmental impact assessment for major development programs that deals with solid waste disposal. In addition, Article 12 demands for the "protection of the environment and the prevention of environmental risks, hazards and nuisances including all kinds of soil, water and air pollution" and recognizes the "unsatisfactory situation of the environment in the West Bank" and the "mutual interest in improving this situation" for which Israel’s active assistance to the Palestinian side is required.

=== Israeli Law ===
According to Eyal Zamie, former deputy and legal advisor for Judea and Samaria, "Expropriation of land for public purposes [in the West Bank] is not prohibited. Three pre-conditions must be met: first, the acquisition is made in accordance with the local law; second, the landlord is fully compensated; and third, the acquisition is for a public purpose." However, Meir Shamgar, the former Israeli Supreme Court President, states, "With respect to expropriation in Judea and Samaria, it should be mentioned that international law generally denies the military government the authority to expropriate land in occupied territories; however, there is evidence supporting the position that it is permissible to expropriate land for the needs of the local population upon payment of compensation." The Israeli Supreme Court allows the local population to dump their waste at the site since it is 'benefiting' them and this legitimizes the expropriation of land for 'public purpose' regardless of the environmental damage that will be caused to surrounding communities in the area. Also, the Israel State Attorney states that if Palestinian communities were no longer permitted to dispose of waste at the site, it would negate "the very legal justification for the existence of the site," regardless of their capability of paying levies. He also states, "It is unreasonable to build and operate a waste disposal site in the heart of a certain population, without that population gaining benefit from the site, while it only bears the environmental costs."
