= Kamel Arekat =

Palestinian-Jordanian militant and politician (1901–1984)

- كامل عريقات

Speaker of the Chamber of Deputies of Jordan
- In office 1970–1984
- Preceded by: Kassim al-Rimawi
- Succeeded by: Akef al-Fayez

Member of the Chamber of Deputies of Jordan
- In office 1951–1984

Personal details
- Born: 26 March 1901 Abu Dis, Jerusalem Sanjak, Ottoman Empire
- Died: 17 July 1984 (aged 83) Amman, Jordan
- Spouses: Rasmia Baidas; Irfat Kamal
- Nickname: Abu Ghazi (أبو غازي)

Military service
- Branch/service: Army of the Holy War
- Years of service: 1944–1951
- Rank: Co-Leader
- Battles/wars: 1948 Arab-Israeli War; Al Qastal; Dheisheh

Kamel Arekat (also Uraygat; Arabic: كامل عريقات, romanized: Kāmil ʿUrayqāt, Palestinian Arabic: ʿRēqāt; 26 March 1901 – 17 July 1984) was a Palestinian-Jordanian militant and politician who served as the Speaker of the Chamber of Deputies of Jordan. He was born in Abu Dis, a town 5 km (3.1 mi) in the east of Jerusalem, to a notable Jordanian originated clan.

== Early life ==
Kamel was born to a notable family. His grandfather, Sheikh Rashid, was known as the leader of the knights assigned by the Ottoman Sultan to protect Christian pilgrims visiting Jerusalem. After the World War I, and the British Mandate for Palestine he served in the British Police in 1926.

== Arab–Israeli conflict ==
Years later, and due to the Jewish immigration to Palestine, he participated in the Arab-Palestinian resistance movement under the leadership of Abd al-Qadir al-Husayni. He vowed to "throw the Jews into the sea".
