= Hikmat Al Masri =

Palestinian businessman and politician (1906–1994)

Minister of Agriculture
- In office 5 May 1953 – 4 May 1954
- Monarch: King Hussein
- Prime Minister: Fawzi Mulki

Personal details
- Born: Hikmat Taher Al Masri; 14 July 1906 Nablus, Ottoman Empire
- Died: 13 December 1994 (aged 88) Nablus, State of Palestine
- Resting place: Nablus
- Party: National Socialist Party (1954–1957)
- Children: 6
- Education: American University of Beirut

Hikmat Al Masri (1906–1994) was a Palestinian origin businessman and politician who served as a member of the Jordanian Parliament representing his hometown Nablus. He was the speaker of the Jordanian Parliament for two terms from 1952 to 1953 and from 1956 to 1957 and the minister of agriculture in the Jordanian government from 1953 to 1954. He was one of three vice presidents of the Palestine Liberation Organization (PLO) in 1964 when it was established. He was also a member of the Jordanian Senate.

== Early life and education ==
Al Masri was born in Nablus, Ottoman Empire, on 14 July 1906. He hailed from a politically elite and merchant family. His family was involved in soap-making business.

After graduating from An Najah School Al Masri obtained a degree in business and economics from the American University of Beirut in 1929.

== Career and activities ==
Following his graduation Al Masri worked at Barclays Bank. He was part of the Nashashibi-led opposition in the British Mandate period and was involved in the Palestinian revolt occurred between 1936 and 1939. When the West Bank was ruled by Jordan he was elected as a deputy for Nablus in the Jordanian Parliament in 1950 and served there until 1957. He was the speaker of the Parliament from 1952 and 1953 and from 1956 and 1957. He was appointed minister of agriculture in 1953 to the Jordanian cabinet and served in the post for one year.

Al Masri joined the National Socialist Party in 1954 and was one of its leaders. He headed a national conference held in Nablus after the dismissal of the cabinet led by Suleiman Nabulsi in March 1957 to support the continuation of the government. Al Masri became a member of the Jordanian Senate in 1962, and his tenure ended in 1971. During this period he also served at times as the acting chairman of the Senate. He was again made a member of the Jordanian Senate on 12 January 1984 which he held until 12 January 1988.

Al Masri was elected as one of three vice presidents of the PLO in 1964 when it was founded in the First Palestinian Conference of the Palestinian National Council. The other two vice presidents were Haidar Abdel-Shafi and Nicola al Dir, and Ahmad Shukeiri was elected as the president of the PLO in the same meeting. One of the supporters of Amin al-Husseini, a Palestinian leading figure, attacked and fired at the Al Masri's house in Nablus on 27 May 1964, the day before the meeting, to cancel it and end the cooperation between Al Masri and Ahmad Shukeiri.

Al Masri led a Palestinian delegation in 1984 to improve the relations between the PLO leader Yasser Arafat and the King of Jordan Hussein.

In addition to his political roles, Al Masri was a merchant and established the Nablus Oil Company. He was the director of Haj Taher Al Masri Co. Ltd. He founded the Nablus-based An-Najah National University. He was the first chairman of the university's board of trustees and served in the post between 1972 and 1994.

== Views ==
Al Masri was one of the Nasserist politicians. He was close to the Hashemite rulers of Jordan.

== Personal life and death ==
Al Masri was married and had six sons.

Al Masri died at his home in Nablus on 13 December 1994 at age 88. He was buried there on 15 December.

== Legacy ==
A stadium in An-Najah National University in Nablus was named after him.
