= Quartet on the Middle East =

Inter-governmental body mediating the Israeli–Palestinian peace process

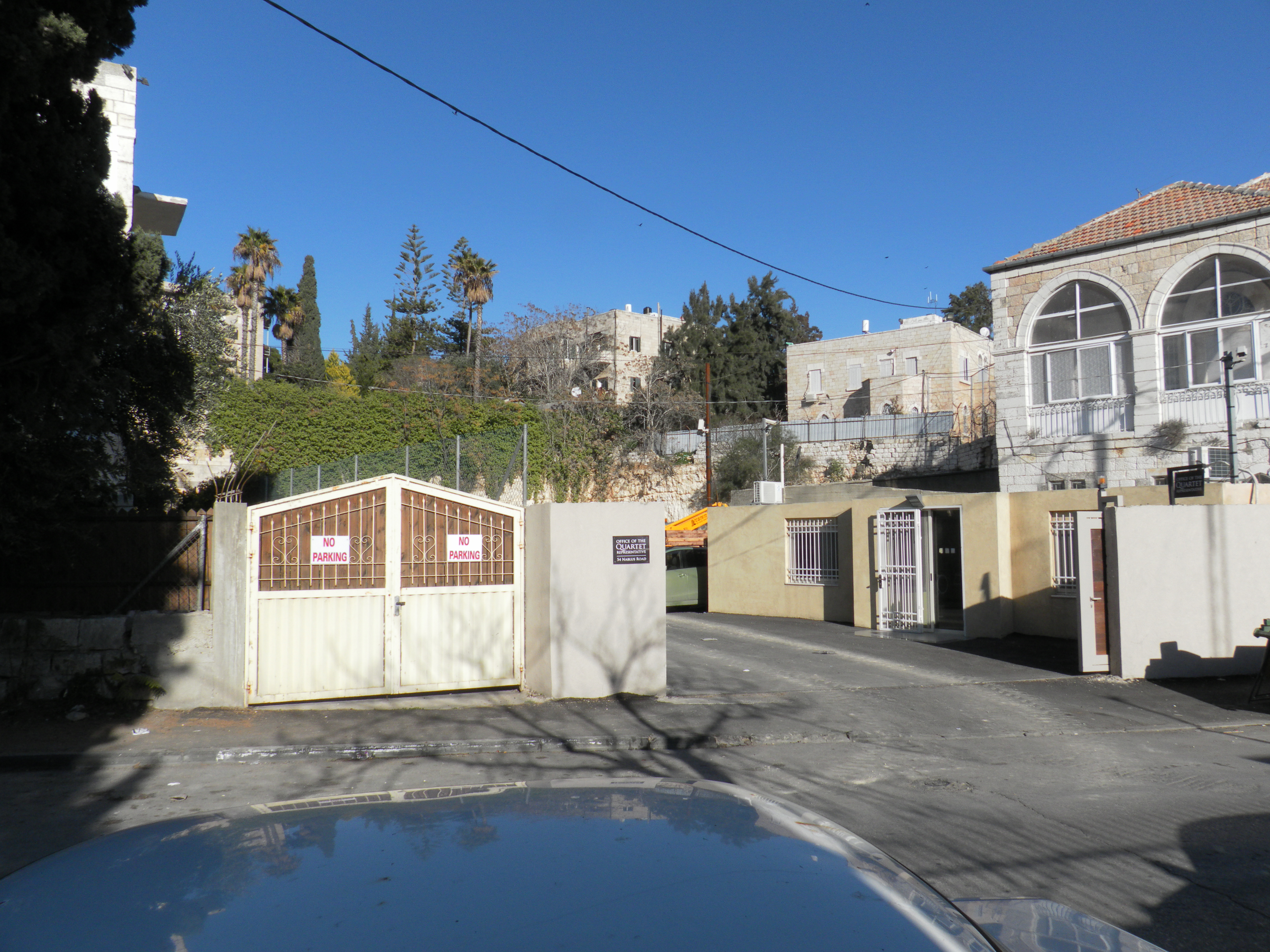
Office of the Quartet in Jerusalem

The Quartet on the Middle East or Middle East Quartet, sometimes called the Diplomatic Quartet or Madrid Quartet or simply the Quartet, is a group of four nations, international and supranational entities involved in mediating the Israeli–Palestinian peace process. The Quartet consists of the United Nations, the United States, the European Union, and Russia. The group was established in Madrid in 2002, recalling the Madrid Conference of 1991, as a result of the escalating conflict in the Middle East.

== History ==
The initiative to establish the Quartet emerged in response to the Second Intifada, which began in September 2000. This period saw numerous unsuccessful attempts at implementing a cease-fire. On October 25, 2001, representatives from the European Union, the United Nations, the United States, and the Russian government met with Palestinian leader Yasser Arafat. During this meeting, they collectively endorsed Arafat's approach towards implementing cease-fire and security reforms within the Palestinian Authority.

In April 2002, during the Israeli incursions into Palestinian areas, the same four entities convened in Madrid. They reiterated their call for the implementation of previously brokered cease-fire agreements by the U.S. government. Additionally, they agreed to transform their cooperation into a permanent forum dedicated to overseeing the Israeli-Palestinian peace process.

In 2002, the Quartet established the Office of the Quartet in East Jerusalem. This office was tasked with taking "tangible steps on the ground to advance the Palestinian economy and preserve the possibility of a two-state solution". Between 2007-2015, the Office was known as the Office of the Quartet Representative and at the time was established to support Tony Blair, the former prime minister of the United Kingdom.

In 2014, at a State Department event, Secretary of State John Kerry and then Quartet Representative Tony Blair appointed De Boer Head of Mission with a specific mandate to implement the Initiative of the Palestinian Economy. De Boer has given several interviews about his role, including one with the YPO, in which he said the two-state solution is the only viable solution. In an interview with CNBC, he talked about Office of the Quartet's role in economic development, and said the Office and a new, related nonprofit deal catalyst, Shurook, want to find $1 billion in outside investment for the Palestinian economy. The Office works with the Palestinian and Israeli governments to create pro-investment policies and win permissions for specific projects, he said. "We do the pre-development work before an investor feels comfortable that they can make an investment," he said.

Kito de Boer led the Office from January 2015 to June 2017, succeeding Tony Blair. Following Blair's resignation, the position of Quartet Representative was not replaced and the Office of the Quartet Representative transitioned into what is now the Office of the Quartet. The Office now reports to the Quartet Members with a mandate to increase Palestinian economic and institutional development and empowerment to support achieving a two-state solution.

The head of the Office is responsible for promoting the Quartet's strategies on Palestinian economic and institutional empowerment, focusing on areas such as the rule of law and economic development, as well as movement and access. As of August 2020, John N. Clarke is the head of the Office.

On March 23, 2021, the Quartet discussed reviving "meaningful negotiations" between Israel and the Palestinians. The focus was on both parties refraining from unilateral actions that would hinder the realization of a two-state solution.

== Special Envoys ==
James Wolfensohn, the former president of the World Bank, was appointed Special Envoy for Israel's disengagement from Gaza in April 2005. He stepped down the following year because of restrictions in dealing with the Islamic militant group Hamas and the withholding of money from the Palestinian Authority, risking its collapse.

Tony Blair announced that he had accepted the position of the official envoy of the Quartet, the same day he resigned as Prime Minister of the United Kingdom and as a Member of Parliament on June 27, 2007. The approval came after initial objections by Russia. The United Nations were overseeing the finances and security of his mission, before his resignation on May 27, 2015.

The special envoy from November 2015 to January 2017 was the Dutch national Kito de Boer.

John N. Clarke was appointed as special envoy on January 17, 2018. He previously held the position as deputy head of mission.

== Peace efforts and actions ==
Tony Blair periodically travelled to the Middle East following his appointment as Special Envoy. On a trip there in March 2008, he met with Israeli leaders to discuss recent violence. A planned meeting between Israeli and Palestinian businessmen was postponed due to recent fighting. In May 2008, Blair announced a new plan for peace and for Palestinian rights, based heavily on the ideas of the Peace Valley plan.

In an August 2009 interview, Blair said that he would like to see Hamas and Hezbollah included in peace talks but under the right conditions, that religious leaders should be more involved in the peace process, and that resolving the conflict could be easier than it was in Northern Ireland.

In a speech given in Israel on August 24, 2010, Blair sharply criticised the campaign of "delegitimization" being carried out by enemies of Israel and proponents of the Palestinians, which refuses to grant Israel its legitimate right to its own point of view and self-defense. "Don't apply rules to the Government of Israel that you would never dream of applying to your own country," he said. He characterized such double standards and prejudice as being an "affront to humanity" which "it is a democratic duty to counter."

In July 2016, the Quartet reported:

The continuing policy of settlement construction and expansion in the West Bank and East Jerusalem, designation of land for exclusive Israeli use, and denial of Palestinian development, including the recent high rate of demolitions, is steadily eroding the viability of the two-state solution. This raises legitimate questions about Israel’s long-term intentions, which are compounded by the statements of some Israeli ministers that there should never be a Palestinian state. In fact, the transfer of greater powers and responsibilities to Palestinian civil authority...has effectively been stopped.

It was within this context that the United Nations passed Security Council Resolution 2334 in December 2016 in another bid to address the settlement question. The report was significantly altered to appease Israel and as well as urging Israel to stop its settlement policy, urged Palestine to end incitement to violence.

In a speech to the UN General Assembly in September 2018, Mahmoud Abbas called Donald Trump's policies towards Palestinians an "assault on international law". He said the US is "too biased towards Israel" indicating that others could broker talks and that the US could participate as a member of the Middle East peace Quartet. Abbas reiterated this position at a UN Security Council meeting on February 11, 2020.

As of September 16, 2020, the UN has not been able to gather the consensus necessary for the Quartet or a group of countries linked to the Quartet to meet. On September 25, 2020, at the UN, Abbas called for an international conference early in 2021 to "launch a genuine peace process."

On February 15, 2021, the Quartet Envoys met virtually and agreed to meet on a regular basis to continue their engagement. On March 23, 2021, the Quartet discussed the reviving of "meaningful negotiations" between Israel and the Palestinians who both need "to refrain from unilateral actions that make a two-state solution more difficult to achieve."

== Criticism and shortcomings ==
Despite the significance officially attached to the Quartet's part in promoting the peace process, many of its statements are merely repetition of previous statements and no significant changes in policy by either the Israeli government or the Palestinian Authority have occurred resulting from a Quartet meeting.

The Quartet has been fiercely criticized for its ineffectiveness. When Tony Blair held the function of Quartet representative, in December 2012, Palestinian officials said that "Tony Blair shouldn't take it personally, but he should pack up his desk at the Office of the Quartet Representative in Jerusalem and go home. They said his job, and the body he represents, are ′useless, useless, useless'".

The Center for Middle East Policy said in February 2012 that "The Quartet has little to show for its decade-long involvement in the peace process. ... Having spent most of the last three years in a state of near paralysis, and having failed to dissuade the Palestinians from seeking UN membership and recognition in September 2011, the Quartet has finally reached the limits of its utility. ... The current mechanism is too outdated, dysfunctional, and discredited to be reformed. Instead of undertaking another vain attempt to 'reactivate' the Quartet, the United States, the European Union, United Nations, and Russia should simply allow the existing mechanism to go quietly into the night".

== Current focus areas ==
Energy Sector: developing and supporting initiatives, policies and projects that address the full generation-transmission-distribution cycle and that contribute to establishing a unified and economically viable sector. This holistic approach incorporates the following mutually re-enforcing sub-objectives:

1. Increasing and diversifying the generation and supply of energy
2. Enabling infrastructure
3. Supporting commercial viability

Water Sector: the OQ supports the address of essential civilian needs, the mitigation of environmental challenges, the enabling of economic development while contributing to a fully functioning sector. The office works with the parties and the international community in advancing the development of the water and the wastewater sectors, by focusing its attention on three interdependent elements:

1. Securing a reliable water supply
2. Enhancing water and wastewater infrastructure
3. Ensuring the commercial and financial viability of the water sector

Rule of Law Sector: As part of its mandate, the OQ aims to 'address Palestinian institutional governance needs focusing as a matter of urgency on the rule of law.’ For this, the rule of law team works closely with the parties and relevant stakeholders, bridging between them as appropriate, while pursuing the office's holistic and integrated approach through its focus in three mutually reinforcing objectives:

1. Strengthening the security sector
2. Strengthening the justice sector
3. Enhancing fiscal and financial stability

Movement and Trade Sector: In its work, the OQ supports the sustainability of the Palestinian economy by enhancing trade and movement of people. By its partnership with relevant parties, the Movement and Trade team currently focuses on three main work streams as set out below:

1. Expanding access of Palestinian Products to New Markets
2. Improving the Traveler and Trading Experience at Allenby/King Hussein Bridge (A/KHB)
3. Trade Facilitation to Reduce Transportation Costs

Telecommunication Sector: The OQ's work in this sector engages with the parties and the relevant stakeholders by supporting the deployment of advanced mobile communications services such as 4G/5G in the West Bank and 3G/4G services in Gaza thus focusing its work on supporting to address three main challenges:

1. To improve access to the radio spectrum
2. To facilitate import of equipment and
3. To enable the entry of materials and construction of infrastructure.

Economic Mapping: The OQ, in close collaboration with the Palestinian Authority, the Palestinian Central Bureau of Statistics, and relevant ministries, is building an interactive web-based economic map of the West Bank and Gaza. The mapping tool is intended to visualize critical data relevant to economic, geographic, social, security, and legal spheres. The purpose of the web-based tool is to empower Palestinian government agencies and institutions as well as the private sector, nongovernmental and international organizations with online datasets, maps, visuals, dashboards, and analytics to support informed policy-making and business decisions to support further strategic economic development.

== See also ==
- Road map for peace
- Soviet Union and the Arab–Israeli conflict
- Quartet Principles

== Notes ==
- ^{a} Proclaimed the Road Map for the two-state solution.
- ^{b} Convened to find a formula for restarting bilateral negotiations; ended without any results.
- ^{c} Condemned settlement expansion in Ariel and East Jerusalem.
- ^{d} Issued a new schedule for resumption of negotiations between the Israeli government and the Palestinian Authority, which called for completing negotiations by end of 2012.
- ^{e} Called upon the parties to resume negotiations.
- ^{f} Meeting with Israeli and Palestinian negotiators in Jerusalem.
- ^{g} A report offered recommendations on the way forward, urging Israel to stop its settlement policy and Palestine to end incitement to violence.
