= Abdul-Latif Arabiyat =

Jordanian politician (died 2019)

Speaker of the House of Representatives of Jordan
- In office 1990–1993

Personal details
- Died: 26 April 2019
- Political party: Islamic Action Front

Abdul-Latif Arabiyat (died 26 April 2019) was a Jordanian politician who served as Speaker of the House of Representatives from 1990 to 1993.
