= Quartet Principles =

Conditions during Israeli-Palestinian conflict

The Quartet Principles are the set of three requirements laid out by the Quartet on the Middle East for the diplomatic recognition of a Palestinian government as part of the Israeli–Palestinian peace process. The three conditions are: 1) non-violence, 2) recognition of the state of Israel, and 3) to respect previous Israel-Palestinian peace agreements.

The principles were first outlined on in October 2005 and reaffirmed in January 2006, after Hamas won the 2006 Palestinian legislative election. Hamas did not accept the conditions set out in the principles.

== Background ==
In 2003, the Quartet on the Middle East, consisting of the United States, European Union, Russia, and United Nations, issued its Road map for peace. Ahead of the 2006 Palestinian legislative election, the Quartet issued two statements on 20 September and 28 December 2005. In the September statement, the Quartet did not prejudge Hamas's participation in the elections, but pointed out the incompatibility between participating in elections and possessing armed militias. In December, the Quartet called on all participants to "renounce violence, recognize Israel’s right to exist, and disarm", adding that the future Palestinian government should not "contain members who are not committed to these principles".

Hamas, a designated terrorist organization by several countries including the European Union and United States, won the election on 25 January 2006. The Quartet led the international community's response to Hamas's victory. On 30 January 2006, the Quartet reaffirmed the principles outlined in its October 2005 statement, announcing that international aid to the Hamas-led government would be contingent on Hamas accepting three conditions: 1) non-violence, 2) recognition of the state of Israel, and 3) to respect previous Israel-Palestinian peace agreements. These were thereafter known as the three Quartet Principles.

== Reactions ==
- U.S. President George W. Bush told reporters that "the Hamas Party has made it clear that they do not support the right of Israel to exist. And I have made it clear, so long as that's their policy, that we will not support a Palestinian government made up of Hamas."
- UN Secretary-General Kofi Annan stated that future aid to a Hamas-led Palestinian government would be "reviewed by donors against that government's commitment to the principles of non-violence, recognition of Israel and the acceptance of previous agreements and obligations."
- European Union foreign policy chief Javier Solana stated that "Once these conditions are fulfilled, the European Union will stand ready to continue to support Palestinian ground development and democratic stability."

As of 1 March 2006, Hamas had not accepted the conditions set out in the principles.

== Aftermath ==
After the formation of the Palestinian National Unity Government of March 2007, the Quartet reaffirmed the principles. The new Palestinian government rejected the principles and the Quartet's calls to recognize Israel.

During violence between rival Palestinian factions in August 2007 as part of the Fatah–Hamas conflict, the Quartet reaffirmed the international aid embargo against the Hamas-led Palestinian government in the absence of Palestinian unity and adherence to the Quartet Principles.

According to political scientist Nathalie Tocci, the principles failed to deliver, as did the Quartet's broader policy toward Hamas.

=== UN Security Council endorsement ===
In United Nations Security Council Resolution 1850 adopted on 16 December 2008, the UN Security Council called on states and international organizations to support a Palestinian government that was "committed to the Quartet Principles and Arab Peace Initiative"..."in preparation for statehood". Former US President George W. Bush personally sponsored the resolution,

Israel lauded UNSCR 1850, stating that "The Security Council's statement that lasting peace can only be based on mutual recognition, ending terror and incitement and committing to the two-state solution, is an endorsement of core Israeli principles for the peace process." Palestinian negotiators called the resolution encouraging, but noted the lack of clarity within the resolution. After the formation of the Second Haniyeh Government, a unity Palestinian government led by Hamas official Ismail Haniyeh, on 17 March 2007, the Quartet reaffirmed that the new Palestinian coalition would have to abide by the three principles in order for direct international aid to resume. In a statement, Haniyeh said his government would respect past peace accords, but that the Palestinians had a legitimate right to resistance in all its forms.

== Later developments ==
The Quartet released a report with 10 recommendations for putting the Israeli-Palestinian peace process back on track in July 2016. Among the recommendations was the reunification of Gaza and the West Bank under a single, legitimate and democratic Palestinian authority on the basis of the PLO platform and Quartet Principles and the rule of law.

After an October 2017 visit by the cabinet of the Palestinian Authority to Hamas-controlled Gaza, the United States via Jason Greenblatt reiterated the Quartet Principles that Hamas must meet in order for a government it sits in to receive diplomatic recognition.

== See also ==
- Road map for peace
