= Abdel-Karim Deghmi =

Jordanian politician (born 1955)

Abdel-Karim Deghmi (born in 1955) is a Jordanian politician. He was Minister of Justice from 1996 to 1997. He was the Speaker of the House of Representatives from 15 November 2021 to November 2022. He attended Expo 2020 in 2020.

== See also ==
- List of current presidents of legislatures
