= Abu Dis =

Village in West Bank, Palestine

Abu Dis أبو ديس
- Municipality type A (city)

Arabic transcription(s)
  - Arabic: أبو ديس
  - Latin: Abu Dis (official)
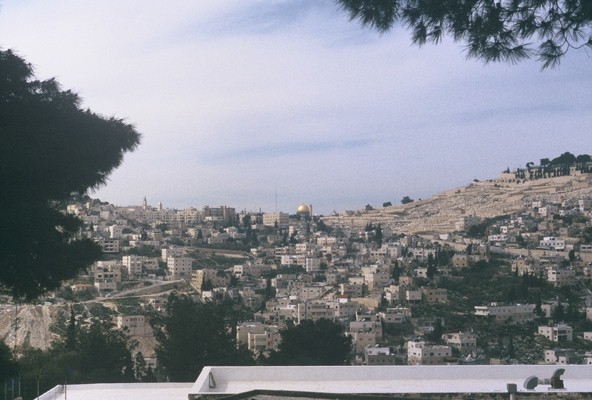

- Location of Abu Dis within the West Bank Location of Abu Dis within Palestine
- Coordinates: 31°45′45″N 35°15′57″E
- Palestine grid: 175/129
- State: Palestine
- Governorate: Quds

Government
  - Type: City
  - Head of Municipality: Adel Salah

Area
  - Total: 28.3 km^{2} (10.9 sq mi)

Population (2017)
  - Total: 12,251
  - Density: 433/km^{2} (1,120/sq mi)
- Name meaning: The exact derivation of "Abu Dis" is widely disputed. Popular etymological theories draw inspiration from Latin for "shy", ancient Greek for "mother of ten villages", an Arabic reference to the trees which once populated the area, or an adaptation of the Roman-era village "Beta Budison" which preceded Abu Dis.
- Website: abudis.ps/en/

Abu Dis or Abu Deis (Arabic: أبو ديس) is a Palestinian village in the West Bank, in the Jerusalem Governorate of the State of Palestine, bordering Jerusalem. Since the 1995 Oslo II Accord, Abu Dis land has been mostly part of "Area B", under Israeli military control and Palestinian civic control. According to the Palestinian Central Bureau of Statistics (PCBS) census, Abu Dis had a population of 12,251 in 2017.

== History ==
Abu Dis is situated on an ancient site, surrounded by deep valleys. Ruins have been found of ancient buildings, cisterns, grape presses and caves, one with a columbarium. Ceramics from Late Roman and Byzantine period has also been found.

The French explorer Victor Guérin believed that Abu Dis was at the location of ancient Bahurim, but this identification is not accepted today.

=== Ottoman era ===
Abu Dis was one of the most populous villages in the Sanjak of Jerusalem during the 16th century, with a population of several hundred. Wheat and barley formed the bulk of cash crops, but were supplemented by grapes, olives, fruit trees, beans, and products from goats and bees. Descendants of Saladin lived in the village and were entrusted one-third of the grain revenue by the Ottoman Empire. The adult males of the village paid a combined 6,250 akçe in annual taxes, a much lower figure than other villages of the same size in the sanjak such as Beit Jala, Ein Karim, and Deir Dibwan. This could indicate that Abu Dis was less prosperous; alternatively, it could be because it had fewer non-Muslims. In October 1553, Shaykh Sa'd al-Din al-Sharafi al-Maliki was appointed as the administrator of the waqf of the village but was replaced in 1554 by Muhammad al-Fakhuri at the request of three prominent villagers who complained to the qadi of Jerusalem. He remained in this position until 1563. In 1596 Abu Dis appeared in Ottoman tax registers as being in the Nahiya of Quds of the Liwa of Quds. It had a population of 80 Muslim households, and paid taxes on wheat, barley, olive trees, vineyards, fruit trees, goats and/or bee hives; a total of 15,000 akçe. All of the revenue went to a waqf.

In 1838 Abu Dis was noted as a Muslim village, part of el-Wadiyeh district, located east of Jerusalem.

When Guérin visited the village in 1870 he noted a house larger and higher than the others, which was that of the local sheikh. An official Ottoman village list from about the same year showed that Abu Dis had 52 houses and a population of 326, though the population count included only men.

By the old village mosque, known locally as Maqam Salah ad-Din, there is a grave with a slab of marble, with a poem written in "elegant naskhi script", dated to 1878.

In 1883, the PEF's Survey of Western Palestine described it as a "village of moderate size in a conspicuous position on a bare flat ridge, with deep valleys round it. The water-supply is from cisterns. Rock-cut tombs exist to the west.

In the late 19th century, the Sheikh of Abu Dis, Rasheed Erekat, promised to guarantee the safety of European tourists and pilgrims on the journey down to Jericho and the River Jordan. According to a 19th-century traveler, the "only way of accomplishing the journey to the Jordan ...(is) by paying the statutory tribute-money to the Sheikh of Abu Dees. This man has the privilege of extracting some sixteen shillings from each traveller who goes down to Jericho...He will send a man, possibly his own son along with you... arrayed in gorgeous apparel and armed with sword and revolver."

In 1896 the population of Abu Dis was estimated to be about 600.

=== British Mandate era ===
In the 1922 census of Palestine conducted by the British Mandate authorities, Abu Diz had a population of 1,029, all Muslims, increasing in the 1931 census to a population of 1,297, still all Muslims, in 272 houses.

In the 1945 statistics, Abu Dis had a population of 1,940 Muslims, with 27,896 dunams of land, according to an official land and population survey. Of this, 4,981 dunams were used for cereals, while 158 dunams were built-up (urban) land.

Between 1922 and 1947, the population of Abu Dis increased by 110%. The town suffered extensive damage in the 1927 Jericho earthquake. All the homes were damaged, and every cistern was cracked. Since Abu Dis depended on rain-water cisterns for its water supply, this caused great hardship. al-Eizariya (Bethany), half a mile away, suffered little damage.

=== Jordanian era ===
According to the UN General Assembly Resolution 194 in 1948, Abu Dis was to be the most Eastern part of the corpus separatum Jerusalem area. However, in the wake of the 1948 Arab–Israeli War, and after the 1949 Armistice Agreements, Abu Dis came under Jordanian rule. It was annexed by Jordan in 1950.

In 1961, the population of Abu Dis was 3,631.

=== 1967–today ===
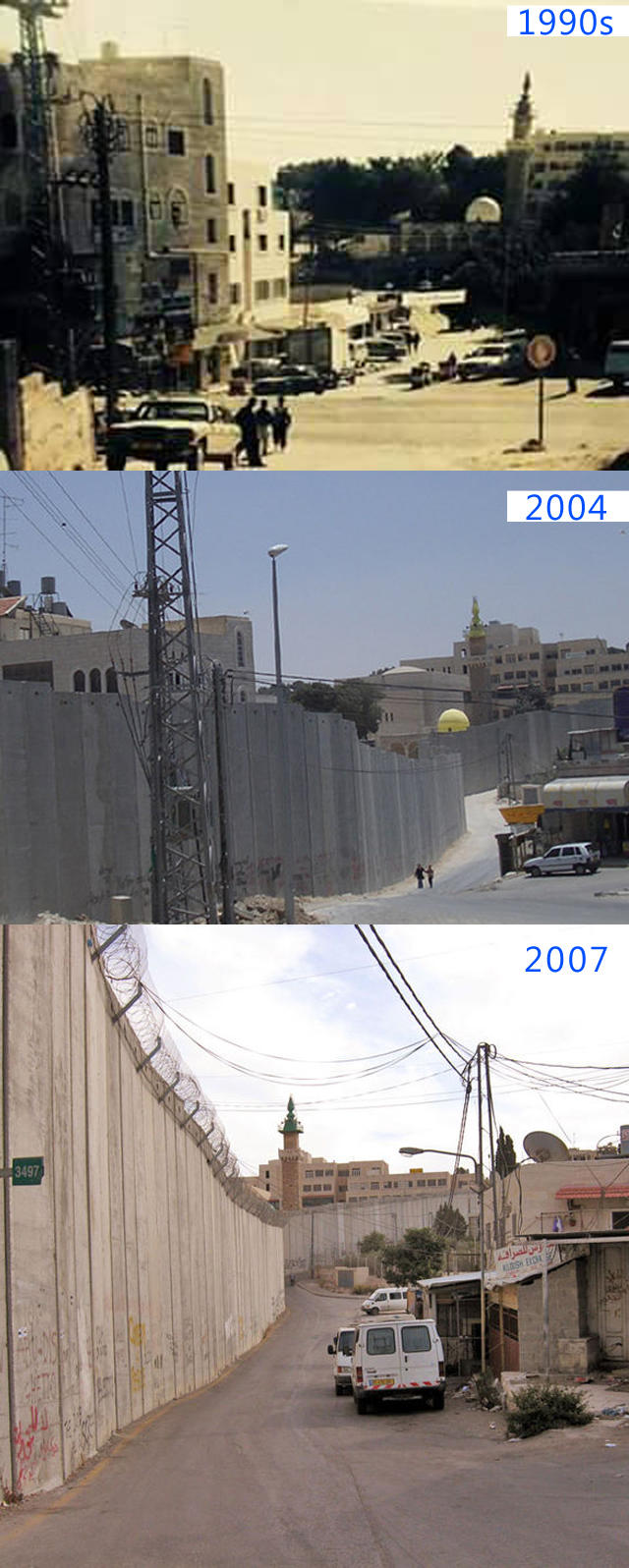
Israeli separation barrier at Abu Dis, 1990s – 2004–2007. This shows a portion of the barrier built by Israel in the West Bank. This part is in Abu Dis, Very close to the eastern part of Jerusalem, ~2 km from al-Aqsa Mosque. It is taken on the Israeli side of the wall, facing south. The local residents on both sides of the barrier at this point are predominantly Palestinian families.

Since the Six-Day War in 1967, Abu Dis has been under Israeli occupation. In the 1967 census it had a population of 2,640.

After the 1995 accords, 85.2% of Abu Dis’ land was classified as Area C, under full Israeli control, while the remaining 14.8% is Area B, meaning that civil affairs have been under the control of the Palestinian National Authority and security matters under the control of the Israel Defense Forces. Israel has confiscated land from Abu Dis in order to construct two Israeli settlements; 1,031 dunams for Ma'ale Adummim, while 348 dunams for Mizpe Yedude (New Kedar).

Most of the Palestinian Authority's offices responsible for Jerusalem affairs are located in the town. In 2000, the construction of a Parliament Building to possibly house the Palestinian Legislative Council was started in Abu Dis, but the project was never finished. Israel has suggested to predestine the location as a substitute for East Jerusalem, the Palestinians' claimed capital. The separation barrier Israel built in Abu Dis runs just a few meters from the location.

== Socioeconomic conditions ==
=== Health ===
Because there are no hospitals in Abu Dis, residents often must travel to neighboring localities to receive medical attention. The nearest available hospitals are thirty kilometers away in Jericho. Palestinians must acquire a permit to go to Jerusalem to seek medical care.

The Al-Maqasid Charitable Society operates Abu Dis's only health center, which lacks an ambulance or specialized healthcare professionals or services.

=== Economy ===
Abu Dis's work force is primarily divided between three economic sectors. 80% of the labor force work as government or private employees, 19% are in the service sector, and 1% work in or for the Israeli government or private Israeli employers. According to 2015 labor statistics of the Jerusalem governorate, 86.1% of Abu Dis's population over the age of 15 are employed, with 87.7% of males and 86.1% of females being employed.

In 2011 Abu Dis housed three factories, one producing brick, another concrete, and the third manufacturing cigarettes. Additionally, Abu Dis had 119 food/grocery stores and 40 trade/service shops.

Around 48% of Abu Dis's territory consists of arable land. Because of this, the village has a significant agricultural sector. Olive trees comprise the vast majority of Abu Dis's commercial agriculture as 530 of the existing 544 fruit trees are olive trees. Sheep are the most commonly available livestock, though Abu Dis's farming community also has cows and goats.

=== Education ===
Schools in Abu Dis include Amal Nursery, Abu Dis Elementary School, New Generation Primary School, Special Needs School, Abu Dis Girls Secondary School, Abu Dis Boys Secondary School, UNRWA Mixed School and Arab Institute. Abu Dis is also home to Al-Quds University.

According to a 2007 poll, nearly 5% of the population is illiterate and 15% has not been formally educated, while only 17% of Abu Dis's residents have collegiate degrees.

=== Institutions ===
The Abu Dis municipal government includes "an office for the Ministry of Interior, a police station, a fire station, a traffic department and a DCO. It also has a number of local institutions and associations that provide services to various sectors of society".

Such institutions include the Abu Dis Local Council, the Abu Dis Cooperative Water Society, the Abu Dis Sports Club, the Camden Center, the Dam'et Al-Quds Center, and the Agricultural Renaissance Institution.

=== Resources/utilities ===
==== Water ====
Because Abu Dis lacks a water reservoir, the village's entire water supply is operated by the Israeli government through the West Bank Water Department. Israeli control over the flow of water into the West Bank has been a point of conflict in recent years as Palestinians have criticized Israel for purposefully bringing about water shortages in the region. Israel has admitted to reducing Palestinian water supply but blames the Palestinian Water Authority for the shortage because the Palestinian Water Authority has refused to allow the Israeli government to upgrade the West Bank's water distribution infrastructure. The PWA argues that such infrastructure will only be used to the benefit of Israeli settlements.

==== Electricity ====
The Jerusalem Electricity Company has been the primary power source in Abu Dis since 1978, though it does not reach all residencies. Telecommunication technology in Abu Dis is available in around 90% of households.

==== Sanitation ====
Solid waste transport and disposal is performed by the Abu Dis Local Council. For wastewater disposal, Abu Dis's residents make use of cesspits because the village has no sewage system; this waste is discarded in unsettled territories.

==== Transportation ====
Travel within and around Abu Dis is largely conducted through the public taxi service and unlicensed cars. There are 33 kilometers of road in Abu Dis. Ten kilometers of main roads are paved and in good condition while three kilometers are in poor condition. Of the 20 kilometers of "secondary roads," 5 are paved in good condition, 5 are paved in poor condition, and 10 are unpaved.

== West Bank barrier and land disputes ==
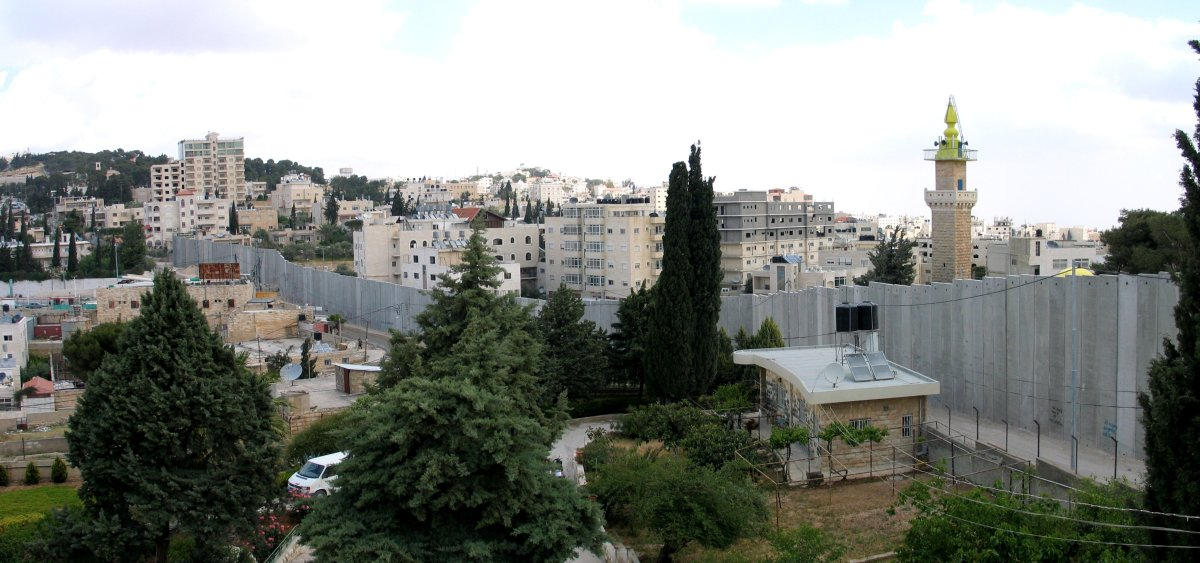
Israeli West Bank barrier separating Abu Dis from Jerusalem

During the Second Intifada, on January 13, 2004, Israel began constructing the Israeli West Bank Barrier, a 20-foot-high concrete wall running through the West Bank. The route of the barrier between Abu Dis and Jerusalem lies east of the Green line, the armistice line established in 1949.

Upon completion, the barrier will border Abu Dis from the north, west, and east. The northern segment of the barrier will fragment the northern and southern hemispheres of the West Bank. The eastern portion of the wall is set to separate Abu Dis's core, urban environment from its rural territories, detaching over 6,000 dunums of arable land from the city's total land area of 28,332 dunums. Currently, the western barrier divides Abu Dis and Jerusalem.

The United Nations humanitarian affairs office charged that the barrier would severely disrupt access to schools, hospitals, and work throughout the West Bank. Israel says that the route of the barrier is determined a security measure, not a political tool.

As a result of the western wall the Cliff Hotel owned by the Ayyad family of Abu Dis has been the focus of a legal dispute in the Israeli courts. The owners sued to halt expropriation of the hotel, built in the mid-1950s. The case involves the application of the Absentee Property Law, which allows the State of Israel to expropriate property within its territory when the owner lives in a country that Israel regards as an enemy. A High Court ruling in February 2010 was still unable to decide whether the law applies to property in East Jerusalem belonging to residents of the Palestinian territories. The government of Norway has supported the Ayyad family. A book about the struggle of the hotel-owner Ali Ayyad and his Norwegian-born wife was published in Norway in 2012.

== Waste disposal site ==
=== Establishment and management ===
The Abu Dis Waste Disposal Site is a landfill opened in 1981 when the Israeli military confiscated territory from Abu Dis for the landfill's creation. In 1998, the Ma'ale Adumim Company became responsible for site management. The company is under the jurisdiction of Ma'ale Adumim, an Israeli settlement in the West Bank. The company has been accused of mismanagement, with critics citing the site's illegal burning of wastes, insufficient barricades to entry, and insufficient, improperly maintained infrastructure.

The Jahalin Bedouin, who previously lived in the territory now occupied by Ma'ale Adumim have been resettled within 300 meters of the Abu Dis waste disposal site, which has led to international concerns for the safety of the Jahalin.

In 2003, the Israeli government announced its intent to close the landfill, however it was subsequently expanded, and did not officially close until 2014 due to overfilling.

=== Legal dispute ===
Controversy surrounded the landfill's establishment as critics argued the expropriation of Abu Dis's land violated International humanitarian law and the Oslo Accords by constituting an unwarranted seizure of an occupied peoples' private property; however the Israeli Supreme Court has argued that because the waste disposal site benefits Palestinians, the land seizure is admissible on account of legal precedent. The Israeli response has spurred further debate, as Palestinians claim that the waste site was designed for the dual purpose of depleting Palestinian territory and disposing Israeli waste, and, therefore, the confiscation of Palestinian did not constitute a measure taken for the good of the occupied peoples. Additionally, Palestinian's accuse Israel of restricting access to the disposal site, directly during periods of escalating tensions and indirectly through the instatement of high levies to use the site. Legality concerns have also been raised with regard to the environmental damage caused by the site.

=== Environmental impact ===
Until 2011, the site received about half of the 1,400 tons of garbage produced every day in the Jerusalem District. An estimated 90% of the waste came from Jerusalem while Israeli settlements contributed 4% of waste and West Bank Palestinian communities contributed 6%. Due to improper infrastructure and overfilling, the waste disposal site has caused pollution in Abu Dis, which has led the United Nations General Assembly to call upon Israel to "cease all actions harming the environment, including the dumping of all kinds of waste materials in the Occupied Palestinian Territory." Environmental externalities include a pervading stench in the surrounding areas, the emission of toxic gases when waste is burned, water pollution, the attraction of stray dogs which have been known to attack villagers' goats.

== Twin cities ==
- Camden, a borough of London in the United Kingdom. Since 2005, many Camden residents have visited Abu Dis and many Abu Dis residents have visited Camden. The visits concentrate on children, women and schools. The twinning activities are supported by the Camden Abu Dis Friendship Association (CADFA), a UK registered charity.
- Reze, in the Pays de la Loire region of western France

== In cinema ==
Some scenes from the film Omar were shot in Abu Dis, such as the first scene when Omar climbs the Israeli West Bank barrier to visit his lover.

== Notable people ==
- Kamel Arekat
- Saeb Erekat
- Ahmed Qurei

== Bibliography ==
- Barron, J.B., ed. (1923). Palestine: Report and General Abstracts of the Census of 1922. Government of Palestine.
- Conder, C.R.; Kitchener, H.H. (1883). The Survey of Western Palestine: Memoirs of the Topography, Orography, Hydrography, and Archaeology. Vol. 3. London: Committee of the Palestine Exploration Fund.
- Dauphin, C. (1998). La Palestine byzantine, Peuplement et Populations. BAR International Series 726 (in French). Vol. III : Catalogue. Oxford: Archeopress. ISBN 0860549054.
- Government of Jordan, Department of Statistics (1964). First Census of Population and Housing. Volume I: Final Tables; General Characteristics of the Population (PDF).
- Government of Palestine, Department of Statistics (1945). Village Statistics, April, 1945.
- Guérin, V. (1874). Description Géographique Historique et Archéologique de la Palestine (in French). Vol. 2: Samarie, pt. 1. Paris: L'Imprimerie Nationale.
- Hadawi, S. (1970). Village Statistics of 1945: A Classification of Land and Area ownership in Palestine. Palestine Liberation Organization Research Centre. Archived from the original on 2018-12-08.
- Hartmann, M. (1883). "Die Ortschaftenliste des Liwa Jerusalem in dem turkeschen Staatskalender dur Syrien auf das Jahr 1288 der Flucht (1871)". Zeitschrift des Deutschen Palästina-Vereins. 6: 102–49.
- Hütteroth, W.-D.; Abdulfattah, K. (1977). Historical Geography of Palestine, Transjordan and Southern Syria in the Late 16th Century. Erlanger Geographische Arbeiten, Sonderband 5. Erlangen, Germany: Vorstand der Fränkischen Geographischen Gesellschaft. ISBN 3920405412.
- Kean, James: Among the holy places; a pilgrimage through Palestine (between 1895 and 1907) T. Fisher Unwin, London, Sixth edition 1908. (1st Edition 1891)
- Mills, E., ed. (1932). Census of Palestine 1931. Population of Villages, Towns and Administrative Areas. Jerusalem: Government of Palestine.
- Mortensen, Yngvil (2012). Cliff Hotel. Familien Ayad vs. staten Israel. Norway: Forlaget Manifest.
- Palmer, E.H. (1881). The Survey of Western Palestine: Arabic and English Name Lists Collected During the Survey by Lieutenants Conder and Kitchener, R.E. Transliterated and Explained by E.H. Palmer. Committee of the Palestine Exploration Fund.
- Robinson, E.; Smith, E. (1841). Biblical Researches in Palestine, Mount Sinai and Arabia Petraea: A Journal of Travels in the year 1838. Vol. 2. Boston: Crocker & Brewster.
- Robinson, E.; Smith, E. (1841). Biblical Researches in Palestine, Mount Sinai and Arabia Petraea: A Journal of Travels in the year 1838. Vol. 3. Boston: Crocker & Brewster.
- Schick, C. (1896). "Zur Einwohnerzahl des Bezirks Jerusalem". Zeitschrift des Deutschen Palästina-Vereins. 19: 120–27.
- Sharon, M. (1997). Corpus Inscriptionum Arabicarum Palaestinae (CIAP): A. Vol. I. Brill. ISBN 9004108335.
- Singer, A. (1994). Palestinian peasants and Ottoman officials. Cambridge University Press. pp. 64–69. ISBN 0-521-45238-4.
- Socin, A. (1879). "Alphabetisches Verzeichniss von Ortschaften des Paschalik Jerusalem". Zeitschrift des Deutschen Palästina-Vereins. 2: 135–63.
- Tobler, T. (1854). Dr. Titus Toblers zwei Bucher Topographie von Jerusalem und seinen Umgebungen (in German). Vol. 2. Berlin: G. Reimer. (pp. 341 ff)
