= Kito de Boer =

Dutch consultant

Kito de Boer (born April 29, 1957) is a Dutch consultant, former senior McKinsey director and former diplomat, who served as head of mission of the Office of the Quartet from May 2015 to June 2017. The Quartet is a foursome of nations, international and supranational entities that mediates between Israelis and Palestinians. The Quartet comprises the United Nations, the United States, the European Union and Russia. The Office of the Quartet, located in East Jerusalem, is mandated to take "tangible steps on the ground to advance the Palestinian economy and preserve the possibility of a two state solution." As head, De Boer led on the Office of the Quartet's strategy on Palestinian economic and institutional empowerment, including matters concerning rule of law and economic development, as well as movement and access.

== Early life and education ==
De Boer was born in Venezuela and educated in England. He earned a BSc in management sciences from Loughborough University and an MBA from Cranfield School of Management.

== Business life and career ==
Early in his career, De Boer worked for Shell Netherlands, and Burroughs Computers in Rancho Bernado, California, and in Detroit, Michigan. He worked for Electrolux S.E. Asia, and was based in Singapore. He joined McKinsey & Co. in London in 1985. In 1992, he went to New Delhi as one of five partners who were a "landing party" for the consulting firm. He helped found the Delhi office, was location manager and headed the consumer goods and retail practice in India. During his time in India, he was elected senior partner.

In 2000, he moved to Dubai to found the consulting firm's Middle East practice. In 2009, he became the leader of McKinsey's Public and Social Sector practice in Europe, the Middle East and Africa, where he was responsible for McKinsey's work for governments and non-profits. From 2012, still based in Dubai, Kito also co-led the McKinsey Center for Government, a global hub for research and innovation in government performance. Journalist Frank Kane, writing in The National, said De Boer counted as confidants many of the most powerful political and business leaders in the world.

De Boer, working as a consultant for The Portland Trust, developed a plan for growth for $13 billion GDP Palestinian economy. On April 24, 2014, at a State Department event, Secretary of State John Kerry and then Quartet Representative Tony Blair appointed De Boer Head of Mission with a specific mandate to implement the Initiative of the Palestinian Economy. In May 2015, Tony Blair stepped aside as Quartet Representative. De Boer has given several interviews about his role, including one with the YPO, in which he said the two-state solution is the only viable solution. In an interview with CNBC, he talked about Office of the Quartet's role in economic development, and said the Office and a new, related nonprofit deal catalyst, Shurook, want to find $1 billion in outside investment for the Palestinian economy. The Office works with the Palestinian and Israeli governments to create pro-investment policies and win permissions for specific projects, he said. "We do the pre-development work before an investor feels comfortable that they can make an investment," he said.

In 2017, De Boer joined the Abraaj Group as its "Managing Partner" to oversee Abraaj’s Impact Investing business and spearhead the group’s global efforts prior to its liquidation due to accusations of fraud.

== Indian art collector ==
De Boer and his wife, Jane Gowers, are noted collectors of Indian art. Their collection, located in New Delhi, London and Dubai and numbering about 1,000 pieces, is one of the largest and most varied collections of modern Indian art in private hands, according to the introduction to a book on the collection by Giles Tilloston titled Modern Indian Painting: From The De Boer Collection. The collection includes works by Ganesh Pyne, Rameshwar Broota, S. H. Raza, Francis Newton Souza, A Ramachandran, Vasudeo Gaitonde, M. F. Husain and K Lama Goud.

De Boer has said he and Gowers collected the art by "a process that is not complicated, just nine words: one object at a time with love and responsibility. ... Collectors are not interesting, the collections are. But if you do an autopsy on the collection then perhaps you can learn about the psychology behind the process of collecting."
