= List of princes of Jordan =

This is a list of Jordanian princes from the accession of Abdullah I of the House of Hashem to the throne of the Jordan in 1946. Individuals holding the title of prince will usually also be styled "His Royal Highness" (HRH). The wife of a Jordan prince will usually take the title and style of her husband.

== List of Jordanian princes since 1946 ==
List of Jordanian Princes
Name	Born	Died	Royal lineage	Notes
First Generation
Talal later, King Talal I	1909	1972	1st son of King Abdullah I	Crown Prince from birth until 20 July 1951.
Naif	1914	1983	2nd son of King Abdullah I	
Second Generation
Hussein later, King Hussein I	1935	1999	1st son of King Talal I & Grandson of King Abdullah I	Crown Prince from 20 July 1951 until 11 August 1952.
Muhammad	1940		2nd son of King Talal I & Grandson of King Abdullah I	Crown Prince from 11 August 1952 until 30 January 1962.
Hassan	1947		3rd son of King Talal I & Grandson of King Abdullah I	Crown Prince from 1 April 1965 until 25 January 1999.
Mushin	1949	1949	4th son of King Talal I & Grandson of King Abdullah I	
Ali	1941		1st son of Prince Naif & Grandson of King Abdullah I	
Asem	1948		2nd son of Prince Naif & Grandson of King Abdullah I	
Third Generation
Abdullah later, King Abdullah II	1962		1st son of Hussein I & Gt-grandson of King Abdullah I	Crown Prince from birth until 1 April 1965 and 25 January 1999 until 7 February 1999
Feisal	1963		2nd son of Hussein I & Gt-grandson of King Abdullah I	
Ali	1975		3rd son of Hussein I & Gt-grandson of King Abdullah I	
Hamzah	1980		3rd son of Hussein I & Gt-grandson of King Abdullah I	Crown Prince from 7 February 1999 until 28 November 2004.
Hashim	1980		4th son of Hussein I & Gt-grandson of King Abdullah I	
Talal	1965		1st son of Prince Muhammad & Gt-grandson of King Abdullah I	
Ghazi	1966		2nd son of Prince Muhammad & Gt-grandson of King Abdullah I	
Rashid	1975		Only son of Prince Hassan & Gt-grandson of King Abdullah I	
Mohammed	1973		1st son of Prince Ali & Gt-grandson of King Abdullah I	
Ja’afar	2007		2nd son of Prince Ali & Gt-grandson of King Abdullah I	
Nayef	1998		Only son of Prince Asem & Gt-grandson of King Abdullah I	
Fourth Generation
Hussein	1994		1st son of Abdullah II & 2xGt-grandson of King Abdullah I	Current Crown Prince from 28 November 2004.
Hashem	2005		2nd son of Abdullah II & 2xGt-grandson of King Abdullah I	
Omar	1993		Only son of Prince Feisal & 2xGt-grandson of King Abdullah I	
Abdullah	2007		Only son of Prince Ali & 2xGt-grandson of King Abdullah I	
Hussein	1999		1st son of Prince Talal & 2xGt-grandson of King Abdullah I	
Muhammad	2001		2nd son of Prince Talal & 2xGt-grandson of King Abdullah I	
Abdullah	2001		Only son of Prince Ghazi & 2xGt-grandson of King Abdullah I	
Hassan	2013		Only son of Prince Rashid & 2xGt-grandson of King Abdullah I	
