= List of Jordanian royal consorts =

Queen of Jordan

Incumbent
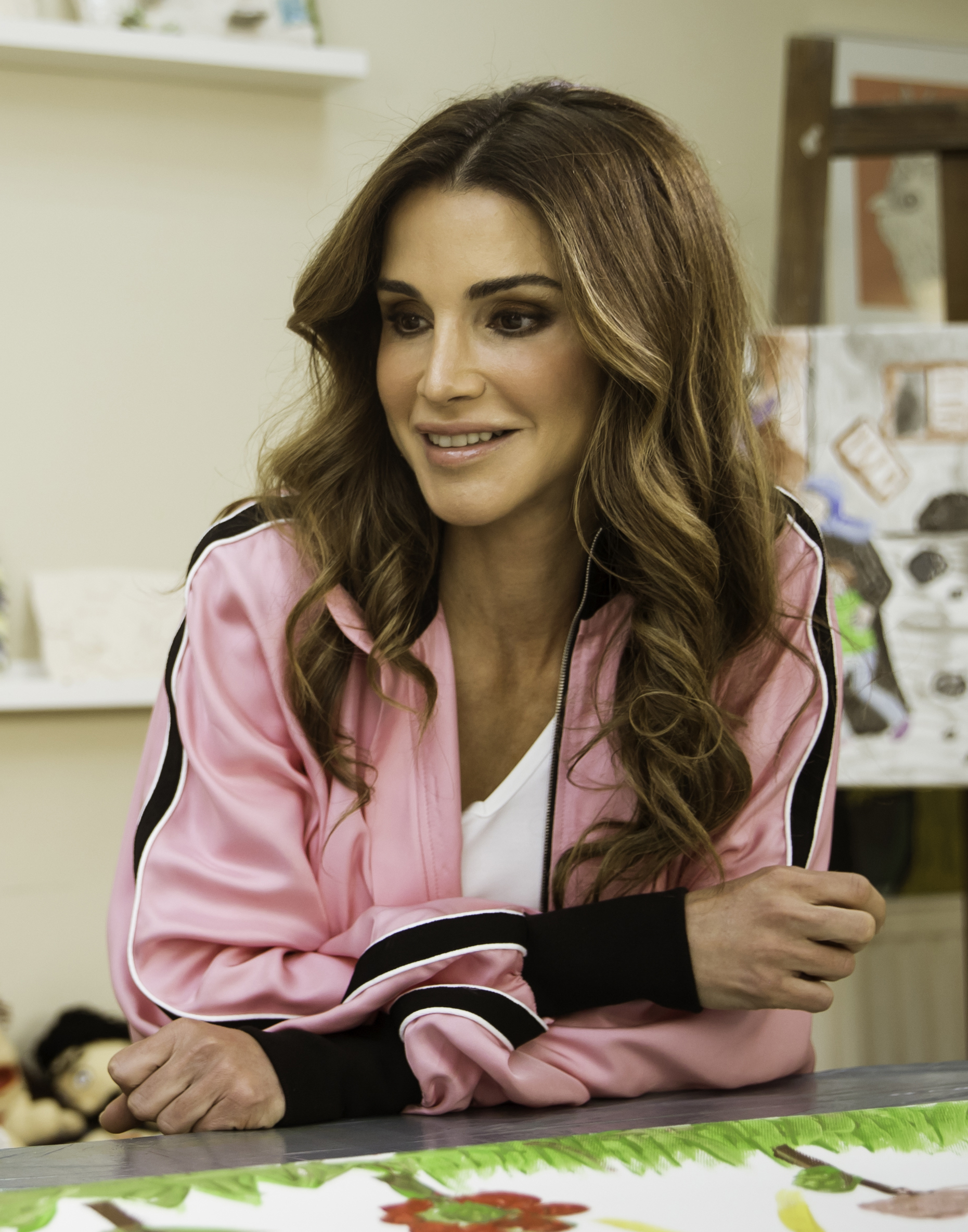
- Rania Al-Yassin since 7 February 1999

Details
- Style: Her Majesty
- Formed: 25 May 1946; 80 years ago
- Residences: Raghadan Palace (official); Beit Al Urdun Palace (private)

This is a list of the women who have been queen/princess consort of the Hashemite Kingdom of Jordan since the emirate was elevated to the status of a kingdom in 1949. Currently, all monarchs of Jordan are required by law to be male, therefore there has never been a queen regnant of Jordan although the law can be changed by royal decree.

It is necessary for the king to give his wife the title of queen consort after his accession and their marriage; otherwise she would only have the lesser title of princess consort. Only one Jordanian consort has not held the title of queen during her marriage.

== List of royal consorts ==
Image	Born as	Consort as	Born	Marriage	Consort		Died	Spouse to
Image	Born as	Consort as	Born	Marriage	From	To	Died	Spouse to
	Musbah bint Nasser	Queen Musbah	1884	1904	25 May 1946; Jordan elevated to kingdom	20 July 1951 husband's death	15 March 1961	Abdullah I
	Zein al-Sharaf bint Jamil	Queen Zein al-Sharaf	2 August 1916	27 November 1934	20 July 1951 husband became king	11 August 1952 husband's abdication	26 April 1994	Talal
	Dina bint Abdul-Hamid	Queen Dina	15 December 1929	18 April 1955		24 June 1957 divorced	21 August 2019	Hussein
	Toni Avril Gardiner	Princess Muna	25 April 1941	25 May 1961		21 December 1972 divorced	living	Hussein
	Alia Toukan	Queen Alia	25 December 1948	24 December 1972		9 February 1977 her death		Hussein
	Lisa Halaby	Queen Noor	23 August 1951	15 June 1978		7 February 1999 husband died	living	Hussein
	Rania Al-Yassin	Queen Rania	31 August 1970	10 June 1993	7 February 1999 husband became king	incumbent		Abdullah II
