= Crown Prince of Jordan =

Heir apparent to the Jordanian throne

- Standard of the Crown Prince

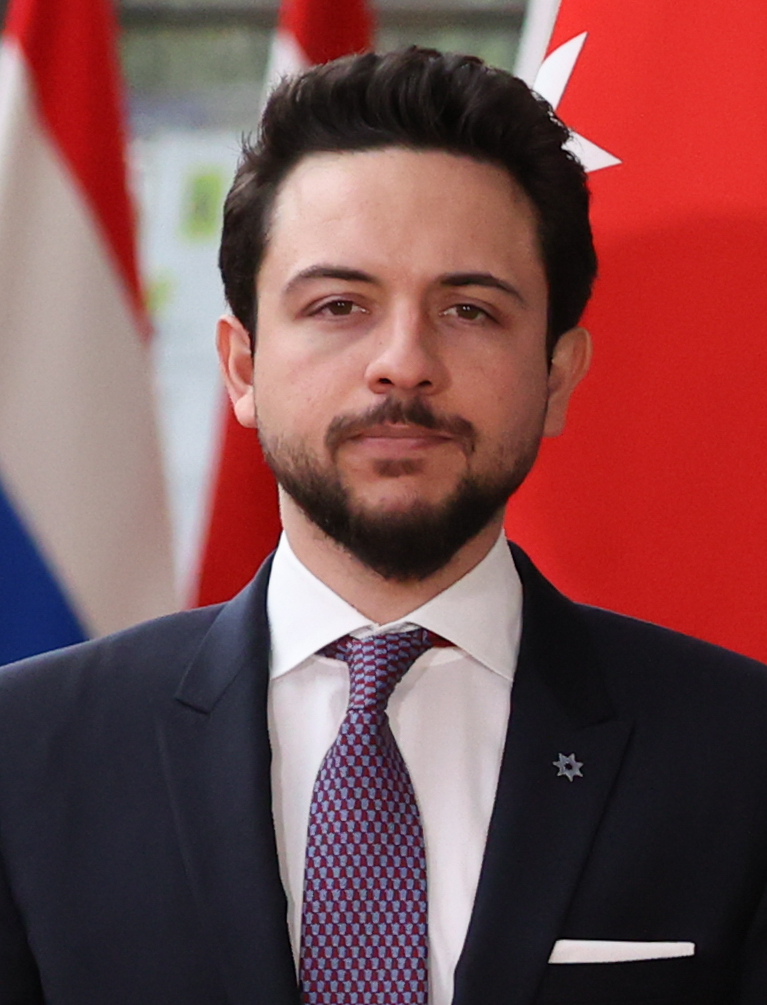
- Incumbent; Hussein since 2 July 2009
- Style: His Royal Highness
- Appointer: King of Jordan
- Term length: Life tenure or until King rescinds the title to give it to another male-line relative
- Inaugural holder: Talal
- Formation: 25 May 1946

The Crown Prince of Jordan is the heir apparent or heir presumptive to the throne of Jordan.

The Article 28(B) of the Constitution of Jordan provides for agnatic primogeniture, meaning that the eldest son of the King automatically succeeds to the crown upon the monarch's death, unless the King has designated one of his brothers to inherit the throne as Crown Prince.

== Crown Princes of Jordan (1946–present) ==
Name	Heir of	Birth	Became Heir–apparent	Created Crown Prince	Ceased to be Crown Prince	Death	Crown Princess
Talal	Abdullah I	26 February 1909	25 May 1946		20 July 1951	7 July 1972	Zein al-Sharaf bint Jamil
Hussein	Talal	14 November 1935	20 July 1951		11 August 1952	7 February 1999	
Muhammad	Hussein	2 October 1940	11 August 1952		30 January 1962	29 April 2021	
Abdullah	Hussein	30 January 1962			1 April 1965		
Hassan	Hussein	20 March 1947	1 April 1965		25 January 1999		Sarvath Ikramullah
Abdullah	Hussein	30 January 1962	25 January 1999		7 February 1999		Rania Al-Yassin
Hamzah	Abdullah II	29 March 1980	7 February 1999		28 November 2004		Princess Noor bint Asem
Hussein	Abdullah II	28 June 1994	28 November 2004	2 July 2009			Rajwa Al Saif

== See also ==
- Succession to the Jordanian throne
