= Succession to the Jordanian throne =

Royal Standard of the Crown Prince

Succession to the Jordanian throne is regulated by Article 28 of the Constitution of Jordan. It consists of the line of people who are eligible to succeed to the throne of the Hashemite Kingdom of Jordan.

== Succession rules ==
The throne currently passes according to agnatic primogeniture, which can be changed by decree. Thus, only male descendants of Abdullah I of Jordan, born to Muslim parents, can ascend the throne.

The king has the right to appoint one of his brothers as heir apparent. If the king dies without a son or appointed brother, the throne devolves upon the person whom the National Assembly selects from amongst the descendants of Hussein bin Ali, King of Hejaz, the founder of the Arab Revolt.

A person can be barred from succession by royal decree on the grounds of unsuitability. His descendants would not be automatically excluded.

== Line of succession ==
- King Hussein I of Hejaz (1854–1931)
  - King Abdullah I (1882–1951)
    - King Talal (1909–1972)
      - King Hussein (1935–1999)
        - King Abdullah II (born 1962)
          - (1) Crown Prince Hussein (b. 1994)
          - (2) Prince Hashem (b. 2005)
        - (3) Prince Faisal (b. 1963)
          - (4) Prince Omar (b. 1993)
          - (5) Prince Abdullah (b. 2016)
          - (6) Prince Muhammad (b. 2017)
        - (7) Prince Ali (b. 1975)
          - (8) Prince Abdullah (b. 2007)
        - (9) Hamzah (b. 1980)
          - (10) Prince Hussein (b. 2019)
          - (11) Prince Muhammad (b. 2022)
        - (12) Prince Hashim (b. 1981)
          - (13) Prince Hussein Haidara (b. 2015)
          - (14) Prince Mohammad Al Hassan (b. 2019)
      - Prince Muhammad (1940–2021)
        - (15) Prince Talal (b. 1965)
          - (16) Prince Hussein (b. 1999)
          - (17) Prince Muhammad (b. 2001)
        - (18) Prince Ghazi (b. 1966)
          - (19) Prince Abdullah (b. 2001)
      - (20) Prince Hassan (b. 1947)
        - (21) Prince Rashid (b. 1979)
          - (22) Prince Hassan (b. 2013)
          - (23) Prince Talal (b. 2016)
    - Prince Nayef (1914–1983)
      - (24) Prince Ali (b. 1941)
        - (25) Prince Muhammad (b. 1973)
          - (26) Prince Hamzah (b. 2007)
          - (27) Prince Haidar (b. 2013)
        - (28) Prince Ja'far (b. 2007)
      - (29) Prince Asem (b. 1948)
        - (30) Prince Nayef (b. 1998)
          - (31) Prince Asem (b. 2023)
          - (32) Prince Naser (b. 2025)
  - Prince Zeid (1898–1970)
    - (33) Prince Ra'ad (born 1936)
      - (34) Prince Zeid II (b. 1964)
        - (35) Prince Ra'ad II (b. 2001)
      - (36) Prince Mired (b. 1965)
        - (37) Prince Rakan (b. 1995)
        - (38) Prince Jafar (b. 2002)
      - (39) Prince Firas (b. 1969)
        - (40) Prince Hashem (b. 2005)
      - (41) Prince Faisal (b. 1975)
        - (42) Prince Hussein (b. 2013)

== List of heirs throughout history ==
=== Heir to Abdullah I ===
- 1946–1951: Talal bin Abdullah, the eldest son of Abdullah I (heir apparent)

=== Heir to Talal ===
- 1951–1952: Hussein bin Talal, the eldest son of Talal (heir apparent)

=== Heirs to Hussein ===
- 1952–1962: Muhammad bin Talal, the younger brother of Hussein (heir presumptive)
- 1962–1965: Abdullah bin Hussein, the eldest son of Hussein (heir apparent)
- 1965–1999: Hassan bin Talal, the second brother of Hussein (by decree)
- 1999: Abdullah bin Hussein, the eldest son of Hussein (by decree and Constitution)

King Hussein's brother, Prince Muhammad, was the heir presumptive to the throne until the birth of Hussein's eldest son, Abdullah. Abdullah was his father's heir apparent from his birth in 1962 until 1965, when Hussein designated his 18-year-old brother Hassan because of the unstable situation at the time.

Shortly after his marriage to Queen Noor, King Hussein instructed his brother to designate Prince Ali (Hussein's eldest son from his marriage to Queen Alia). However, by 1992, he had changed his mind. Besides his own sons, Hussein seriously regarded his nephew, Prince Talal bin Muhammad, as his possible heir. Finally, on 25 January 1999, shortly before his death, Hussein proclaimed Abdullah his heir apparent again and was succeeded by him on his death.

=== Heirs to Abdullah II ===
- 1999–2004: Hamzah bin Hussein, the third brother of Abdullah II (by decree)
- 2004–present: Hussein bin Abdullah, the eldest son of Abdullah II (2004–09 by Constitution; 2009–present by decree and Constitution)

== See also ==
- Crown Prince of Jordan
