= Dina bint Abdul-Hamid =

Queen of Jordan from 1955 to 1957

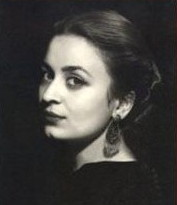
- Dina in the 1950s

Queen consort of Jordan
- Tenure: 19 April 1955 – 24 June 1957
- Born: Sharifa Dina bint Abdul-Hamid bin Muhammad; 15 December 1929; Cairo, Kingdom of Egypt
- Died: 21 August 2019 (aged 89); Amman, Jordan
- Burial: Raghadan Palace
- Spouse: Hussein of Jordan (m. 1955; div. 1957) Salah Ta'amari (m. 1970)
- Issue: Princess Alia bint Hussein
- House: Hashemite
- Father: Sharif Abdul-Hamid bin Muhammad Abdul-Aziz Al-Aun
- Mother: Fahria Brav

Dina bint Abdul-Hamid (Arabic: دينا بنت عبد الحميد; 15 December 1929 – 21 August 2019) was a Hashemite princess and Queen of Jordan from 1955 until 1957 as the first wife of King Hussein. She was the mother to Hussein's oldest child, Princess Alia bint Hussein. She and the king were married from 1955 to 1957, and in 1970 she married a high-ranking official in the PLO. She was a graduate of the University of Cambridge and a lecturer in English literature at Cairo University.

== Early life and education ==
Dina was born on 15 December 1929 in Cairo, Kingdom of Egypt to Sharif Abdul-Hamid bin Muhammad Abdul-Aziz Al-Aun (1898–1955) and his wife, Fahria Brav (died 1982). A member of the House of Hashim, she had the honorific title sharifa of Mecca as an agnatic descendant of Hasan ibn Ali, the grandson of Muhammad. Dina was also a third cousin of her future father-in-law, King Talal of Jordan. Through her mother, Dina was connected to Egypt's Circassian elite. Her father and uncles claimed a waqf that consisted of nearly 2,000 feddans.

Like many children of the landed Arab aristocracy, Dina was sent to a boarding school in England. She next obtained a degree in English literature from Girton College, Cambridge University, and a post graduate diploma in social science from Bedford College, London.

After her return home, she began to teach English literature and philosophy at the University of Cairo while residing in the affluent suburb of Maadi with her parents. As a young woman, Dina was considered beautiful, highly educated, sophisticated and emancipated. She was well-liked by her entourage and friends.

== Queen of Jordan ==
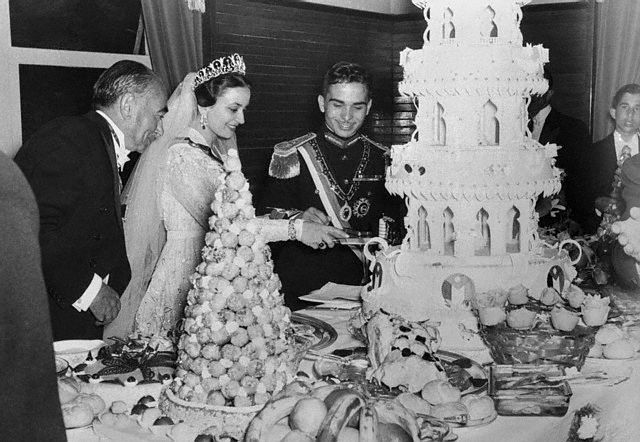
King Hussein and Queen Dina on their wedding day, 19 April 1955

Dina first met her distant cousin Hussein in 1952 in London at the home of a relative from Iraq. The King was then studying at the Harrow School while she was studying at Girton College, Cambridge and was pursuing a Bachelor of Arts degree and obtained it with honours. After her graduation, she returned to Egypt, where Hussein visited her in Maadi thereafter.

In 1954, two years after her son's accession to the throne, Hussein's mother, the Dowager Queen Zein al-Sharaf, who exerted a significant influence early in his reign, announced the engagement of the King and Dina. The match was considered to be perfect as Dina was a Hashemite princess, and brought up with the best education the West had to offer. The union was also strongly favoured by Gamal Abdel Nasser, the future President of Egypt. They were married on 19 April 1955 at Raghadan Palace. The bride was 25 and the groom was 19 at the time.

Upon her marriage, Dina became Queen of Jordan. According to author Isis Fahmy, who interviewed Dina in the presence of her husband on their wedding day, Hussein determinedly said that she would have no political role. Fahmy noted that Hussein had intended to exercise authority over Dina, who was herself a strong personality, and that his mother viewed her as a threat to her own status.

It soon became apparent that the king and queen had little in common. On 13 February 1956, she gave birth to the king's first child, Princess Alia, but the arrival of a child did not help the royal marriage.

== Princess of Jordan ==
In 1956, while the queen was on a holiday in Egypt, the king informed her about his intention to separate from her. Hussein likely did so at the prompting of his mother, Queen Zein al-Sharaf, with whom Dina was on bad terms. The couple divorced on 24 June 1957, during a period of strain between Jordan and Egypt, at which time she became known as HRH Princess Dina Abdul-Hamid of Jordan. The ex-queen was not allowed to see her daughter for some time after the divorce.

On 7 October 1970, Dina married Lieut-Colonel (later Major general) Asa'ad Suleiman Hassan Abdel Qader Suleiman (b. 27 October 1942 in Za'atara–d. 23 April 2022 in Bethlehem), alias Salah Ta'amari, a Palestinian guerrilla commando who became a high-ranking official in the Palestine Liberation Organization. He was imprisoned by the Israelis in 1982. A year later, Dina negotiated one of the largest prisoner exchanges in history—freeing her husband and 5,000 other prisoners (Palestinians and Lebanese).

== Death and funeral ==
Princess Dina died in Amman on 21 August 2019, aged 89. The cause of her death was not stated. On the same day, King Abdullah II, Crown Prince Hussein, Prince Hassan, and other male members of the royal family attended her funeral at the Royal Cemetery. Senior officials and officers also offered their condolences to the King and members of the royal family. The King then took part in the noon prayer and the funeral prayer at the Royal Guards Mosque.

== International roles and positions ==
- Honorary president of the Muslim Women's Association of the United Kingdom

== Notable published works ==
- Duet for Freedom, Quartet Books Ltd, 268 pages, (29 January 1988). ISBN 0704326779

== Honours ==
National

- Dame Grand Cordon of the Supreme Order of the Renaissance, special class (19 April 1955).

Foreign

- Spain: Dame Grand Cross of the Order of Civil Merit (3 June 1955).

== Ancestry ==
Ancestors of Dina bint Abdul-Hamid

8. Amir Aun ar-Rafiq Pasha, Grand Sharif and Emir of Mecca
4. Sharif Muhammad Abdul-Aziz Al-Aun Bey
9. Fatima Khanum
2. Sharif Abdul-Hamid bin Muhammad Abdul-Aziz Al-Aun
10. Sayyid Asad
5. Sayyida Fatima bint Asad
1. Sharifa Dina bint Abdul-Hamid
3. Fahria Brav

== Bibliography ==
- Avi Shlaim (2008). Lion of Jordan: The Life of King Hussein in War and Peace. Penguin UK . ISBN 9780141903644.

Royal titles
Vacant Title last held by Zein al-Sharaf Talal	Queen consort of Jordan; 18 April 1955 – 24 June 1957	Vacant Title next held by Muna al-Hussein as princess consort
