= Abdullah of Jordan =

Abdullah of Jordan or Abdullah bin Hussein may refer to:

- Abdullah I of Jordan (1882–1951), emir of Transjordan from 1921 to 1946 and then king of Jordan from 1946 to 1951
- Abdullah II of Jordan (born 1962), the current king of Jordan since 1999

== See also ==
- Monarchy of Jordan
- Hussein, King of Jordan, grandson of Abdullah I and father of Abdullah II
