= Flag of Amman =

Amman
- Use: Other
- Proportion: 1:2
- Adopted: 30 January 2009
- Design: The foreground shows the word Amman written in Arabic in the Amman sans serif font, and in the background hills and houses can be seen.

The flag of Amman is the flag of the city and municipality of Amman, Jordan. The foreground shows the word Amman, written in Arabic, in the Amman sans-serif font, and in the background there are hills and houses. The flag was adopted by the greater municipality of Amman in 2009 as part of the city's centennial of the founding of Amman's first municipality in 1909 along with a similar logo, replacing the old "Arch flag" used since 1956. It was first raised on the morning of King Abdullah’s birthday; 30 January 2009.

Thousands of citizens participated in selecting the new flag from among four designs created by the Municipality and displayed at Al Hussein Cultural Center during December and early January for public voting.

The Flag of Amman depicts the seven hills, signifying that Amman was originally built on seven hills, and the capital's homes perched atop those hills affirm that its a city that provides stability for its residents. Each hill is depicted in a different color in the “new logo” symbolizing Amman's diversity. The interplay between the hills’ colors also signifies the interaction between the various city facets.

== Gallery ==
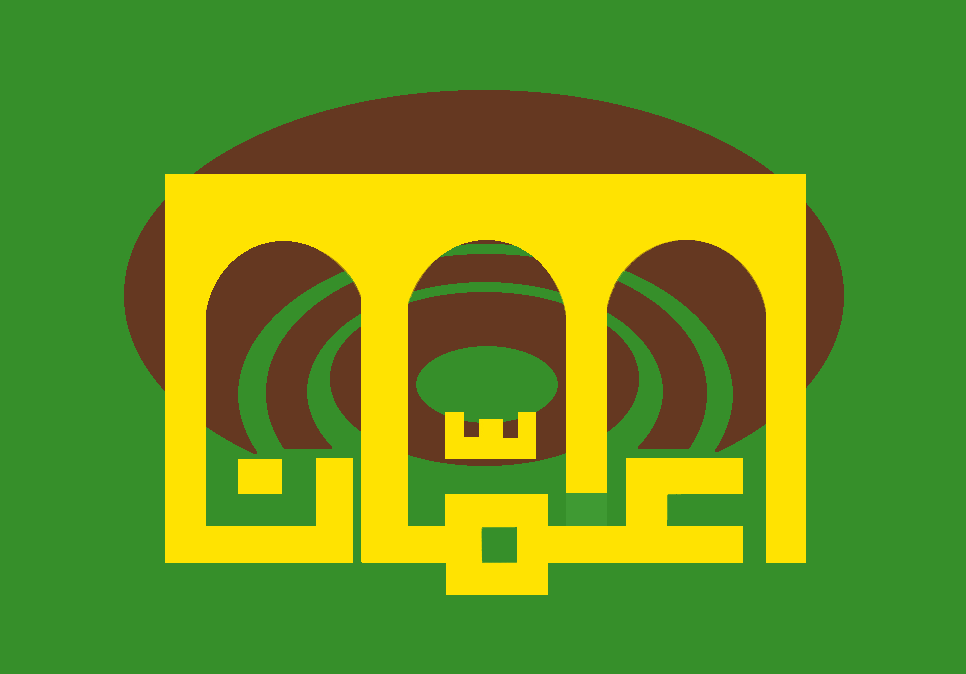
"Arch Flag" (1956 - 2009 )

The current flag (2009-present)
