= Zein al-Sharaf bint Jamil =

Queen of Jordan from 1951 to 1952

Zein al-Sharaf
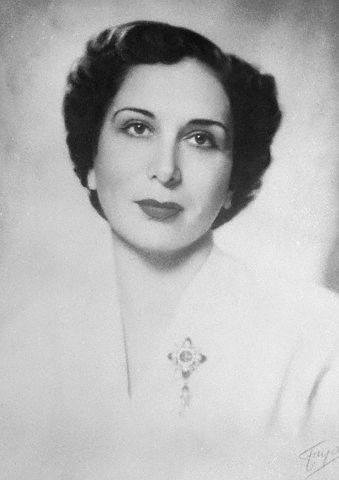
- Zein al-Sharaf in 1953

Queen consort of Jordan
- Tenure: 20 July 1951 – 11 August 1952
- Born: 2 August 1916; Cairo, Sultanate of Egypt (present-day Egypt)
- Died: 26 April 1994 (aged 77); Lausanne, Switzerland
- Burial: Raghadan Palace
- Spouse: King Talal (m. 1934; died 1972)
- Issue: King Hussein; Prince Muhammad; Prince Hassan; Princess Basma
- House: Hashemite
- Father: Sharif Jamil bin Nasser
- Mother: Wijdan Hanim

Zein al-Sharaf bint Jamil (Arabic: زين الشرف بنت جميل; 2 August 1916 – 26 April 1994) was Queen of Jordan as the wife of King Talal. She was the mother of King Hussein.

== Family ==
She was born in Alexandria, Egypt, into a family of Hejazi and Turkish Cypriot origin. Her mother was Wijdan Hanim, the daughter of Shakir Pasha, who was the grandnephew of the Ottoman-Turkish Cypriot Governor of Cyprus Kâmil Pasha. Her father, Sharif Jamil bin Nasser, was the governor of Hauran; he was the nephew of Sharif Hussein bin Ali of Mecca. Her paternal aunts were Musbah bint Nasser and Huzaima bint Nasser.

== Marriage and children ==
Zein al-Sharaf married her first cousin Prince Talal bin Abdullah of Jordan on 27 November 1934, with whom she had three sons and one daughter:

- King Hussein (14 November 1935 – 7 February 1999)
- Prince Muhammad (2 October 1940 – 29 April 2021)
- Prince Hassan (born 20 March 1947)
- Princess Basma (born 11 May 1951)

== Career ==
Zein al-Sharaf played a major role in the political development of the Jordanian Kingdom in the early 1950s, by supporting efforts in charitable works and women's rights.

She took part in the writing of the 1952 Constitution that gave certain rights to women and enhanced the social development of the country. She also created the first women's union of Jordan in 1944. Zein al-Sharaf further filled a constitutional vacuum after the assassination of the late King Abdullah I in 1951, while the newly proclaimed King Talal was being treated outside the Kingdom. The Queen again performed this role during the period between August 1952, when her son, King Hussein, was proclaimed monarch, and May 1953, when he assumed constitutional duties at the age of eighteen.

Following the arrival of Palestinian refugees into Jordan after the 1948 Arab-Israeli War, she led national relief efforts to help the tens of thousands of refugees. She was also instrumental in establishing the women's branch of the Jordan National Red Crescent Society in 1948. Throughout her life, Queen Zein al-Sharaf dedicated time and energy to the Um Al Hussein orphanage in Amman.

== Honours ==
=== National honours ===
- Jordan:
  - Dame Grand Cordon with Collar of the Order of al-Hussein bin Ali.

=== Foreign honours ===
- Malaysia:
  - Honorary Grand Commander of the Order of the Defender of the Realm (SMN (K)) - Tun (24 April 1965)

Royal titles
Preceded by Musbah Al-Abdullah	Queen consort of Jordan; 20 July 1951 – 11 August 1952	Succeeded by Dina Al-Hussein
