= Order of Al-Hussein bin Ali =

Highest order of the Kingdom of Jordan

Order of al-Hussein bin Ali وسام الحسين بن علي (Arabic)
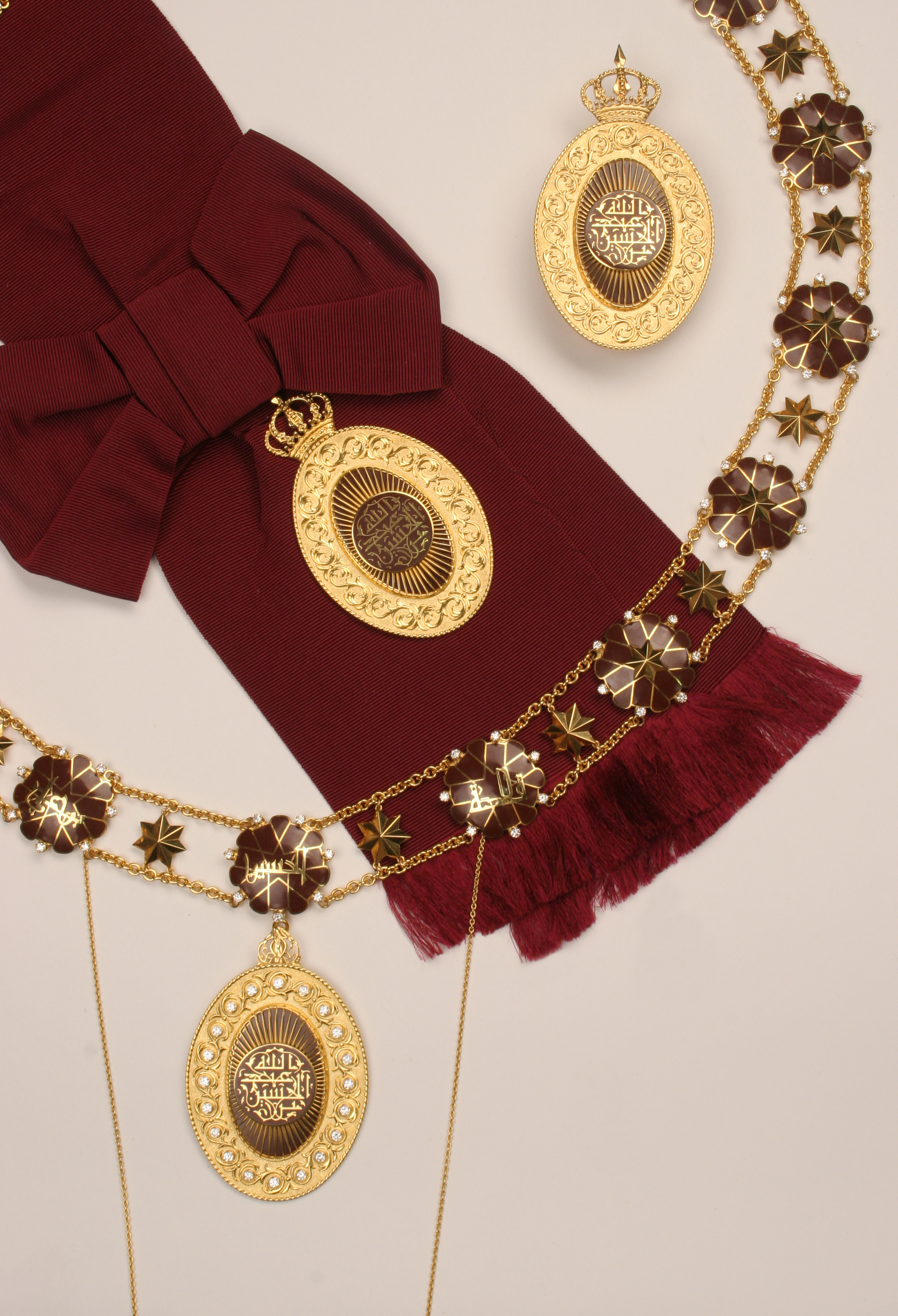
- Collar & Grand Cordon of the Order al-Hussein bin Ali

Awarded by Jordan
- Type: Order
- Awarded for: Foreign allied heads of state and senior royals
- Status: Currently constituted
- Sovereign: Abdullah II of Jordan
- Grades: Collar
- Former grades: Sash

Precedence
- Next (higher): None (highest)
- Next (lower): Supreme Order of the Renaissance
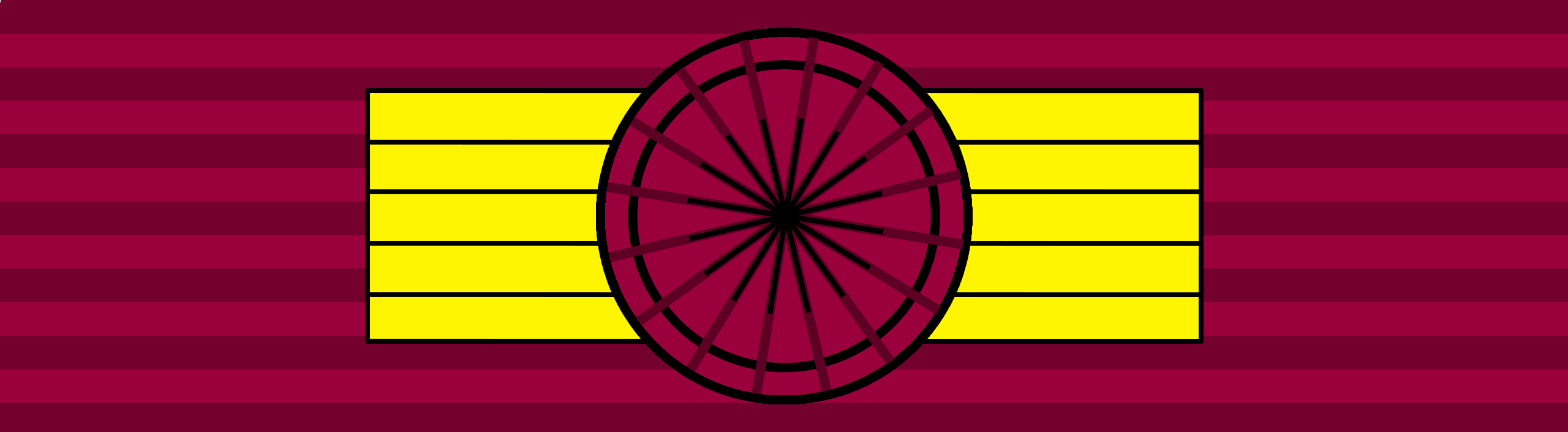
- Ribbon bar of the order

The Order of al-Hussein bin Ali is the highest order of the Kingdom of Jordan. It was founded on 22 June 1949 with one class (i.e. Collar) by King Abdullah I of Jordan with the intended recipients being foreign heads of state and senior royals.

Unlike other Jordanian orders, the Order of Hussein bin Ali has only one class and is the kingdom's only collar-grade award.

In 1967, a second class of the Order was instituted as the "Sash of Hussein bin Ali," by order of a decree of King Hussein. This decree was rescinded by King Hussein in 1977 and it reverted to having only one class. Recipients of the Sash during this period were automatically upgraded to the Collar in 1977.

== Insignia ==
- The collar is made of a double chain in gold and enamel with alterning golden stars of five points and small dark red-enamelled flowers decorated in gold with sentences in Arabic
- The star is made of a gold-and-diamond oval with at its centre a dark radiating red disc with a golden sentence in Arabic. The badge is hung to the Grand Cordon through ua golden royal crown.
- The sash badge has the same design as the star.
- The ribbon of the class of Grand Cordon is violet, however it is rarely worn.

== Selected recipients ==
- Akihito
- Prince Ali bin Hussein
- Alia al-Hussein
- Azlan Shah of Perak
- Hassanal Bolkiah
- Habib Bourguiba
- Carl XVI Gustaf of Sweden
- Elizabeth II
- Faisal II of Iraq
- Farouk of Egypt
- Harald V of Norway
- Hassan II of Morocco
- Prince Hassan bin Talal
- Václav Havel
- Hussein of Jordan
- Idris of Libya
- Isa bin Salman Al Khalifa
- Jaber Al-Ahmad Al-Sabah
- Juan Carlos I of Spain
- Mohammad Reza Pahlavi
- Mohammed V of Morocco
- Ferdinand Marcos
- Bhumibol Adulyadej
- Suharto
- Muhammad Zia-ul-Haq
- Mohammed VI of Morocco
- Margrethe II of Denmark
- Prince Muhammad bin Talal
- Philippe of Belgium
- Willem-Alexander of the Netherlands
- Princess Muna al-Hussein
- Putra of Perlis
- Qaboos bin Said al Said
- Queen Rania of Jordan
- Mohammed Zahir Shah
- Hamad bin Khalifa Al Thani
- Zein al-Sharaf Talal
- Miloš Zeman
- Prince Ra'ad bin Zeid
- Salman of Saudi Arabia
- Sultan bin Salman Al Saud
- Mohammed bin Zayed Al Nahyan
- Mohammed bin Salman
- Haitham bin Tariq
- Tamim bin Hamad Al Thani
- Recep Tayyip Erdoğan
- Ibrahim Iskandar of Johor

== Resources ==
- Order of al-Hussain ibn Ali
- Hussein ibn Ali Sash
- Order of al-Hussain ibn Ali
