= Musbah bint Nasser =

Queen consort of Jordan (1884–1961)

Queen consort of Jordan
- Tenure: 25 May 1946 – 20 July 1951
- Born: 1884; Mecca, Ottoman Empire
- Died: 15 March 1961 (aged 76–77); Irbid, Jordan
- Spouse: Abdullah I of Jordan (m. 1904; died 1951)
- Issue: Princess Haya; King Talal; Princess Munira
- House: Hashemite
- Father: Amir Nasser Pasha
- Mother: Dilber Khanum
- Religion: Islam

Musbah bint Nasser (Arabic: مصباح بنت ناصر, "lamp of light"; 1884 – 15 March 1961) was the first Queen of Jordan as the wife of King Abdullah I.

She was born in 1884 in Mecca, Ottoman Empire. Her title at birth was Sharifa of Mecca. She was the elder twin daughter of Amir Nasser Pasha and his wife Dilber Khanum, the younger being Huzaima, Queen consort of Syria and Iraq as wife of Faisal I.

In 1904, Musbah married Sayyid Abdullah bin al-Husayn later King Abdullah I of Jordan at Stinia Palace, İstinye, Istanbul, Ottoman Empire. They had a son and two daughters:

- Princess Haya (1907 – 1990). Married Abdul-Karim Ja'afar Zeid Dhaoui.
- King Talal I (26 February 1909 – 7 July 1972).
- Princess Munira (1915 – 1987). Never married.

Abdullah went on to take two more wives. He married Princess Suzdil Khanum in 1913 (daughter of 'Ali) and Nahda bint Uman in 1949 (a Sudanese woman), making Musbah his senior wife. On 25 May 1946, Abdullah was proclaimed King of Jordan and Musbah, as his first wife, became Queen of Jordan.

Musbah died on 15 March 1961 in Irbid, Jordan.

== Titles ==
- 1884 – 1904: Alsharifa Musbah bint Nasser
- 1904 – 1 April 1921: Her Royal Highness Princess Musbah Al-Abdullah
- 1 April 1921 – 25 May 1946: Her Highness Emira of Transjordan
- 25 May 1946 – 20 July 1951: Her Majesty The Queen of Jordan
- 20 July 1951 – 11 August 1952: Her Majesty The Queen Mother
- 11 August 1952 – 15 March 1961: Her Majesty Queen Musbah

Royal titles
New title	Queen consort of Jordan; 25 May 1946 – 20 July 1951	Succeeded by Zein al-Sharaf Talal
