= List of kings of Jordan =

King of the Hashemite Kingdom of Jordan
- Arms of His Majesty the King of the Hashemite Kingdom of Jordan

Incumbent
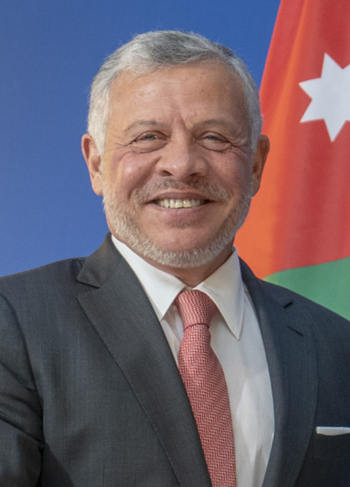
- Abdullah II since 7 February 1999

Details
- Style: His Majesty
- Heir apparent: Hussein, Crown Prince of Jordan
- First monarch: Abdullah I
- Formed: 25 May 1946; 80 years ago
- Residences: Raghadan Palace (official); Beit Al Urdun Palace (private)

The king of the Hashemite Kingdom of Jordan (Arabic: ملك المملكة الأردنية الهاشمية) is the monarchical head of state of Jordan. He serves as the head of the Jordanian monarchy—the Hashemite dynasty. The king is addressed as His Majesty (صاحب الجلالة).

Jordan is a constitutional monarchy. However, the king is vested with somewhat more executive and legislative power than is typically the case for constitutional monarchs. He is commander-in-chief of the Jordanian Armed Forces, appoints the prime minister and the directors of security agencies. He also appoints the members of the upper house of Parliament, the Senate, as well as the members of the Constitutional Court.

The current king, Abdullah II, took the throne on 7 February 1999 following the death of his father, Hussein.

== History ==
The sons of Hussein bin Ali, the Grand Emir and Sharif of Mecca were set up as the kings of Iraq (Faisal I) and Jordan (Abdullah I) in the aftermath of the Arab Revolt and World War I.

The Jordanian monarchy was set up in 1921, with Abdullah I becoming emir of the Emirate of Transjordan, a post he held from 11 April 1921 until Transjordan gained independence on 25 May 1946 as the Hashemite Kingdom of Transjordan. Once independence was gained, Abdullah was crowned the country's first monarch. The country's name was shortened to the Hashemite Kingdom of Jordan on 26 April 1949, after the kingdom won control of both sides of the Jordan River as a result of the 1948 Arab–Israeli War.

== Monarchs of Jordan (1921–present) ==
=== Emirate of Transjordan (1921–1946) ===
Name	Lifespan	Reign start	Reign end	Notes	Family	Image
Abdullah I: عبد الله الأول بن الحسين	2 February 1882 – 20 July 1951 (aged 69)	11 April 1921	25 May 1946	Previously King-designate of Iraq for a short period in 1920. Son of Hussein bin Ali	Hashemite	Abdullah I of Jordan

=== Hashemite Kingdom of Jordan (1946–present) ===
Name	Lifespan	Reign start	Reign end	Notes	Family	Image
Abdullah I: عبد الله الأول بن الحسين	2 February 1882 – 20 July 1951 (aged 69)	25 May 1946	20 July 1951 (assassinated)	Proclaimed King of Palestine by the Jericho Conference in 1948	Hashemite	Abdullah I of Jordan
Talal: طلال بن عبد الله	26 February 1909 – 7 July 1972 (aged 63)	20 July 1951	11 August 1952 (abdicated)	Son of Abdullah I	Hashemite	Talal of Jordan
Hussein: الحسين بن طلال	14 November 1935 – 7 February 1999 (aged 63)	11 August 1952	7 February 1999	Son of Talal	Hashemite	Hussein of Jordan
Abdullah II: عبد الله الثاني بن الحسين	30 January 1962 (age 64)	7 February 1999	Incumbent	Son of Hussein	Hashemite	Abdullah II of Jordan

== Royal Standard ==
Royal Standard of the King

== See also ==
- History of Jordan
- Royal Hashemite Court
- Crown Prince of Jordan
- List of Jordanian royal consorts
- List of Sunni dynasties
