= Constitution of Jordan =

Constitution of the Hashemite Kingdom of Jordan

- Created: 1 January 1952
- Presented: 1 January 1952
- Ratified: 1 January 1952
- Date effective: 8 January 1952
- Media type: Constitution
- Subject: Law
- Purpose: Constitution / Basic Law

The Constitution of the Hashemite Kingdom of Jordan was adopted on 1 January 1952. It revised the previous Constitution of 1947 to expand the powers of the legislature and add checks to the executive power of the cabinet. The Constitution defines a system of hereditary monarchic rule with a parliamentary system of representation. It stipulates the separation of state power into three branches: the executive, composed of the King and an appointed cabinet; the legislative, consisting of a bicameral legislature; and the judicial, composed of civil, religious, and constitutional courts. The Constitution also outlines the citizenry's rights and duties, legal protocols, taxation procedures and other constitutional regulations.

== Background ==
After the Hashemite led Arab Revolt against the Ottoman Empire during World War I, Transjordan was controlled by the newly proclaimed Arab Kingdom of Syria. Syrian King Faisal I exerted control in the region through a policy of subsidization of local Bedouin tribes, holding little direct jurisdiction outside of several cities. With the commencement of the Franco-Syrian War after Faisal I's government failed to gain recognition at the Paris Peace Conference, Syrian authority over Transjordan rapidly collapsed. By early 1920 political power in the region was solely held by local tribal groups. In July 1920, the United Kingdom attempted to establish control of Transjordan in line with their claim over the region established by the Sykes-Picot Agreement. The United Kingdom wished to establish an indirect administration in the country distinct from British Mandatory Palestine. This led to the adoption of a strategy of home rule, where British officers attempted to establish several centralized local governments. These local governments came to be co-opted as an extension of the establish tribal order, and the failure led to the pursuit of a new strategy for governance. In March 1921, the United Kingdom proclaimed the Emirate of Transjordan as the new centralized government of the region under the British Mandate for Palestine. Under the new Emirate, executive power was delegated to Hashemite prince and Faisal I's brother Emir Abdullah I.

The emirate's first constitution was put into effect following the promulgation of an Organic Law in April 1928 for use under the British mandate. The Organic Law was divided into 7 sections which outlined the rights of the citizenry, the powers of the emir, and established a semi-democratic legislative council. The Organic Law, while nominally establishing Transjordan as an independent state, granted significant control over the emirate's economy, foreign policy and military to the United Kingdom, solidifying British mandatory control over the country. The powers vested in the Emir largely superseded that of the Legislative Council. The Emir held unchecked veto power over new legislation and was able to dissolve the Legislative Council at will, allowing the emirate to function as an effective dictatorship. The 1928 Organic Law remained the supreme law of Jordan in a largely unchanged state until the dissolution of the British mandate in 1946.

After the dissolution of the Mandate for Palestine in May 1946, a new Jordanian constitution was promulgated in the Official Gazette on 1 February 1947, and later ratified on 28 November later that year. The new Constitution differed little in content compared to the 1928 Organic Law, and the Anglo-Jordanian alliance signed in March 1946 maintained the United Kingdom's privileged position in government. The Constitution received wide criticism as being pro-British and anti-democratic, especially amongst Palestinian citizens in the recently annexed West Bank. Instability from anti-British unrest was compounded by the assassination of King Abdullah I in 1951, threatening Hashemite rule in Jordan. In an effort to alleviate internal tensions, King Talal and Prime Minister Tawfik Abul-Huda oversaw the promulgation of a liberalized constitution on 1 January 1952. The revised articles granted the House of Representatives to ability to modify internal finances, ratify foreign treaties, dissolve the cabinet via no-confidence vote, and override royal vetoes.

== Amendments ==
Article 126 describes the constitutional amendment process. The article stipulates that amendments follow the same approval process as ordinary laws with the exception of the approval threshold from each house being raised from an absolute majority to a two-thirds majority. Furthermore, Article 93, which grants the legislature the power to override royal vetoes, does not apply to constitutional amendments.

Constitutional amendments revise the text of existing articles and an article has never been removed from, nor added to, the Constitution. Recently, the Jordanian constitution has undergone several series of amendments, including in 2011 and 2016. In 2021 a series of amendments was introduced, some of which led to a brawl in the parliament. These amendments were aiming to further women's rights and modernize Jordan.

== See also ==
- Line of succession to the Jordanian throne
- Hussein of Jordan
