= Assassination of Abdullah I of Jordan =

1951 murder in Jerusalem

- Part of the Arab–Israeli conflict and Palestinian political violence
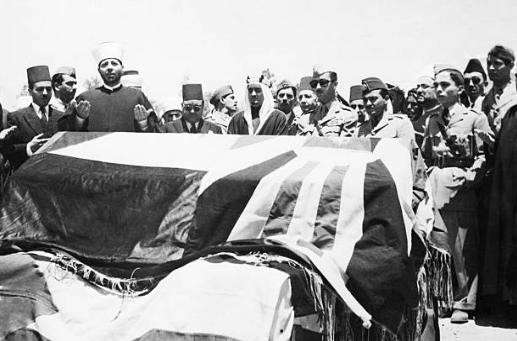
- Abdullah I's coffin, 29 July 1951
- Location: 31°46′34″N 35°14′09″E; Al-Aqsa Mosque, East Jerusalem, Jordanian West Bank
- Date: July 20, 1951; 75 years ago
- Target: Abdullah I of Jordan
- Weapon: Revolver
- Deaths: 2 (King Abdullah I and perpetrator)
- Perpetrator: Mustafa Shukri Ashshu
- Motive: Desire for an independent Palestinian state, which Abdullah had prevented by the Jordanian annexation of the West Bank

On 20 July 1951, King Abdullah I of Jordan was assassinated while visiting the Al-Aqsa Mosque in Jerusalem. Abdullah was in Jerusalem to give a eulogy at the funeral of Prime Minister Riad Al Solh of Lebanon. He was attending Friday prayers at the mosque with his grandson Prince Hussein. Abdullah was fatally shot three times in the head and chest.

The assassin, 21-year-old Mustafa Shukri Ashu, was shot dead by Abdullah's bodyguards. Ten men were accused of plotting the murder; eight faced trial, and six were sentenced for their role in the crime. The assassination led to a succession crisis due to the mental illness of his son and successor, Talal.

The event marked the fourth major assassination in the Middle East in 1951, following the deaths of Riad Al Solh, Iranian Prime Minister Ali Razmara, and Iranian Education Minister Abdul Hamid Zangeneh. The killings were a sign of increased instability in the region.

== Background ==
=== King Abdullah I of Jordan ===
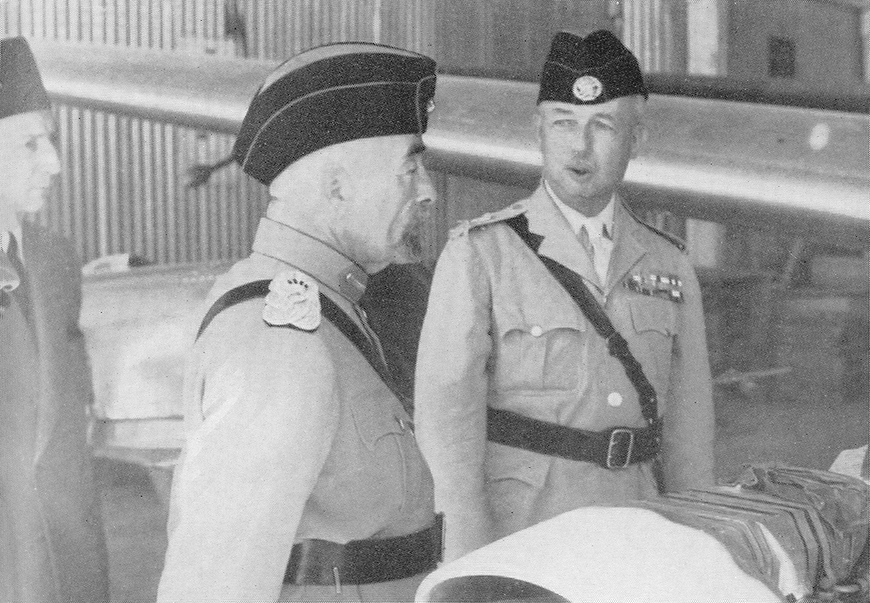
King Abdullah with Glubb Pasha, the day before his assassination, 19 July 1951

King Abdullah I, born in Mecca in 1882, was a prominent figure in the Arab Revolt against the Ottoman Empire during World War I. As a son of Hussein bin Ali, the Hashemite leader of the revolt, Abdullah played a key role in Arab efforts to gain independence. After the war, he established the Emirate of Transjordan under British mandate and later became its first king when the Hashemite Kingdom of Jordan was proclaimed independent in 1946.

Abdullah's reign was marked by efforts to modernize his kingdom and navigate the turbulent regional politics of the post-World War II era; he was considered a moderate leader with ideologies that aligned with the west, which is said to have ultimately been a cause for his assassination. He sought to strengthen Jordan's political and military institutions and often acted as a mediator between the Arab world and Western powers. His policies and alliances made him a divisive figure, particularly among Arab nationalists.

=== Abdullah's role in the Palestine-Israel conflict ===
The establishment of the State of Israel in 1948 and the ensuing Arab-Israeli War were pivotal moments in Abdullah's reign. Unlike many Arab leaders who pursued a policy of uncompromising hostility toward Israel, Abdullah attempted to foster friendly relations with the country, going as far as to have secret meetings with the Jewish Agency for Israel. Future Israeli prime minister Golda Meir was one of those present in the meetings, which eventually came to a mutually agreed upon partition plan in November 1947.

Abdullah supported the Peel Commission in 1937, which proposed that Palestine be split up into a Jewish state and areas to be annexed into Transjordan. Many Arabs within Palestine and the surrounding countries objected to the Peel Commission. Ultimately, it was not adopted. In 1947, when the United Nations supported the partition of Palestine into one Jewish and one Arab state, Abdullah was the only Arab leader who supported the decision.

During the 1948 Arab–Israeli War, Jordan's Arab Legion, commanded by British officers, was the most effective Arab force and succeeded in capturing the West Bank, including East Jerusalem. However, Abdullah's willingness to engage in backchannel negotiations with Israel angered many Palestinians and other Arab leaders, who accused him of prioritizing Hashemite interests over the Palestinian cause.

Abdullah's policies regarding the West Bank further alienated Palestinian nationalists. Following the war, he annexed the West Bank to Jordan in a controversial move that was widely considered illegal and void, including by the Arab League, and that was recognized only by the United Kingdom, Iraq and possibly Pakistan.

His relatively good relationship with Jewish and Western leaders had garnered him a negative reputation and suspicion in the Arab world. He did not trust other Arab leaders, who did not trust him in return. He was unpopular in many Arab countries, and had made enemies due to his willingness at trying to achieve a peace treaty with Israel.

On 16 July 1951, former Lebanese Prime Minister Riad Al Solh was assassinated in Amman, Jordan, following rumours of Lebanon and Jordan organizing a peace deal with Israel. Abdullah arrived in Jerusalem shortly after in order to deliver a eulogy.

== Assassination ==
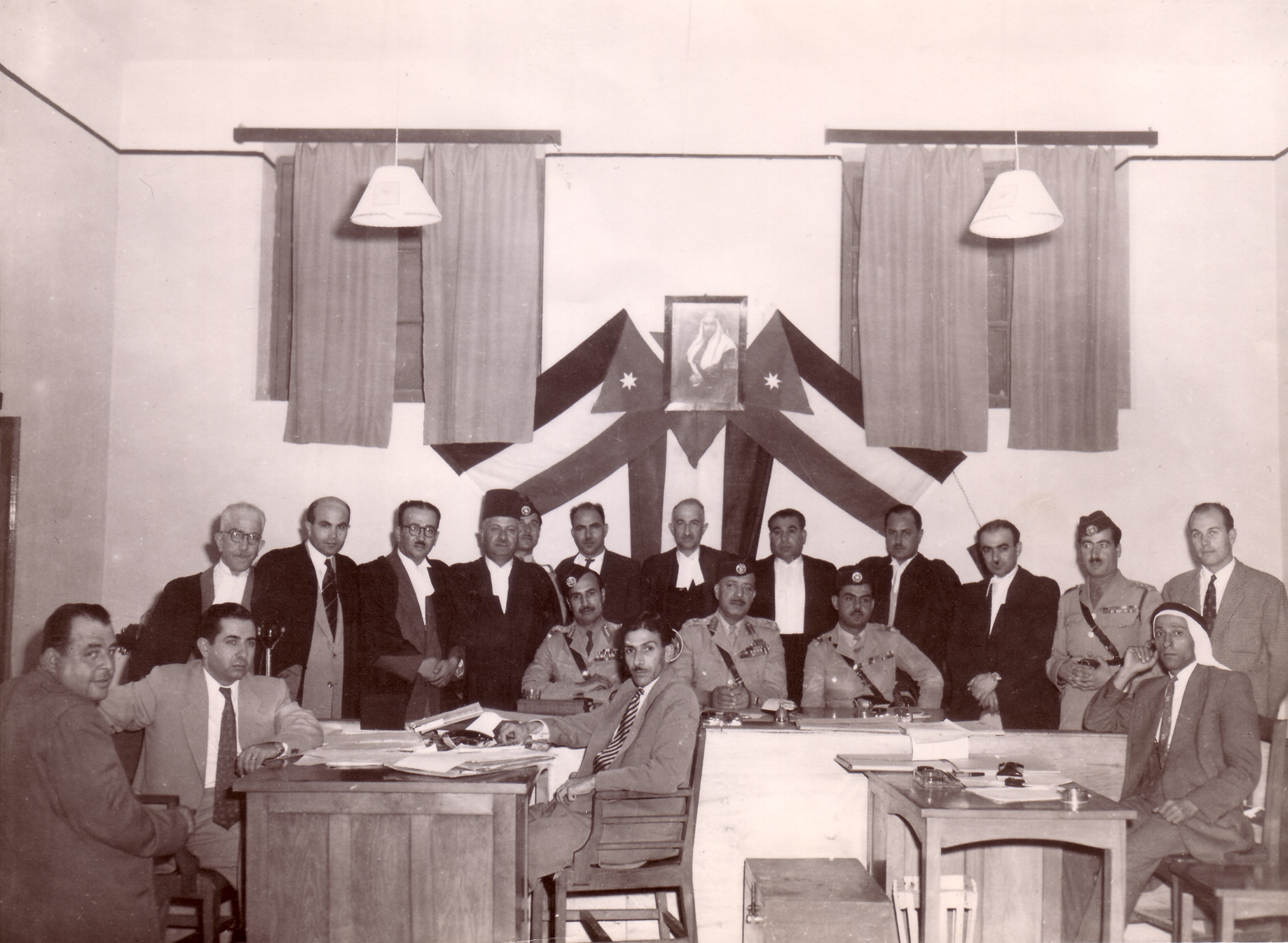
The trial for the murder, 18 August 1951

On 20 July 1951, Abdullah visited the Al-Aqsa Mosque with his grandson Prince Hussein. At the time, Jerusalem was divided between Israeli and Jordanian control, with the eastern part of the city, including the Old City and the Al-Aqsa Mosque, under Jordanian administration. Abdullah was in Jerusalem to give a eulogy at the funeral of Al Solh and for a prearranged meeting with Reuven Shiloah, head of Mossad, and Moshe Sasson, diplomat.

Abdullah had been invited to the mosque by religious leaders, and it was during his attendance at the mosque that he was fatally shot. As Abdullah approached the entrance to the mosque, a gunman, later identified as a 21-year-old Palestinian named Mustafa Shukri Ashshu, shot him in the chest. He had hidden behind the main gate of the mosque and fired at close range. He was then shot by a bodyguard. Abdullah died instantly. Contemporary media reports attributed the assassination to a secret order based in Jerusalem known only as "the Jihad", discussed in the context of the Muslim Brotherhood.

The assassin, Mustafa Shukri Ashshu (Arabic: مصطفى شكري عشو, romanized: Muṣṭafa Šukriyy ʿAššū), was a 21-year-old Palestinian tailor associated with the exiled Grand Mufti of Jerusalem, Amin al-Husseini. Abdullah had officially removed him from his post in 1948 and banned him from entering Jerusalem. Those associated with the ex-Mufti were described as "bitter enemies" of Abdullah, as they supported the establishment of a Palestinian state which Abdullah had stopped by annexing the West Bank.

According to Alec Kirkbride, a British Resident in Amman, Ashu was a "former terrorist", recruited for the assassination by Zakariyya Ukah, a livestock dealer and butcher. The Guardian and The Washington Post reported that he was a member of an armed force known as the "Army of the Holy War" that sought an independent Palestinian Arab state, and was associated with the former Mufti of Jerusalem.

Ashu was killed. The revolver used to kill the king was found on his body, as well as a talisman with "Kill, thou shalt be safe" written on it in Arabic (اقتل، تَسلم ʿuqtul, taslamu). The son of a local coffee shop owner named Abdul Qadir Farhat identified the revolver as belonging to his father. In his absence, the King's younger son Prince Nayef bin Abdullah took the oath of allegiance as Regent. A state of emergency was proclaimed throughout Jordan. Abdullah is buried at the Royal Court in Amman. He was succeeded by his son Talal. Since Talal had troubled relations with his father because he was experiencing mental illness, reported as schizophrenia, Talal's son Prince Hussein became the effective ruler as King Hussein at the age of sixteen, three months before his 17th birthday.

== Legal proceedings ==
On 11 August, the Prime Minister of Jordan Tawfik Abu Al-Huda announced that ten men would be tried in connection with the assassination. Ten men were accused of complicity in the assassination, and eight were sent to trial for their alleged role. These suspects included Colonel Abdullah at-Tell, who had been Governor of Jerusalem, and Musa Ahmad al-Ayubbi, a Jerusalem vegetable merchant who had fled to Egypt in the days following the assassination. General Abdul Qadir Pasha Al Jundi of the Arab Legion was to preside over the trial, which began on 18 August. Ayubbi and at-Tell, who had fled to Egypt, were tried and sentenced in absentia. Three of the suspects, including Musa Abdullah Husseini, were from the prominent Palestinian Husseini family, leading to speculation that the assassins were part of a mandate-era opposition group.

The Jordanian prosecutor asserted that Colonel at-Tell, who had been living in Cairo since January 1950, had given instructions that the killer, made to act alone, be slain immediately after, to shield the instigators of the crime. Jerusalem sources added that Col. at-Tell had been in close contact with the former Grand Mufti of Jerusalem, Amin al-Husayni, and his adherents in the Kingdom of Egypt and in the All-Palestine protectorate in Gaza. At-Tell and Husseini, and three co-conspirators from Jerusalem, were sentenced to death. On 28 August 1951, six men (two in absentia) were sentenced to death for their roles in planning the assassination. On 6 September 1951, Musa Ali Husseini, 'Abid and Zakariyya Ukah, and Abd-el-Qadir Farhat were executed by hanging.

== Succession crisis ==
Emir Abdullah I had two sons: future King Talal and Prince Nayef. Talal, being the eldest son, was considered the "natural heir to the throne". Talal's troubled relationship with his father led Emir Abdullah to remove him from the line of succession in a secret royal decree during World War II. Their relationship improved after the Second World War and Talal was publicly declared heir apparent by the Emir.

Tension between Emir Abdullah and then-Prince Talal continued after Talal had been "compiling huge, unexplainable debts". Both Emir Abdullah and Prime Minister Samir Al-Rifai were in favor of Talal's removal as heir apparent and replacement with his brother Nayef. Kirkbride warned Emir Abdullah against such a "public rebuke of the heir to the throne", a warning which Emir Abdullah reluctantly accepted and then proceeded to appoint Talal as regent when the Emir was on leave.

A major reason for Kirkbride's reluctance to allow the replacement of Talal was his well-known hostility to Britain, which led the majority of Jordanians to assume that Kirkbride would automatically favor the ascension of the pro-British Nayef. Kirkbride is said to have reasoned that Nayef's "accession would have been attributed by many Arabs to a Machiavellian plot on the part of the British government to exclude their enemy Talal". Kirkbride wished to ensure that the Jordanian public, heavily sympathetic towards Arab nationalism, did not come under the impression that Britain was still actively interfering in the affairs of newly independent Jordan.

The conflicts between his two sons led Emir Abdullah to seek a secret union with Hashemite Iraq, in which Abdullah's nephew Faisal II would rule Jordan after Abdullah's death. This idea received a positive reception among some in the British Foreign Office. It was ultimately rejected, as Iraq's domination of Jordan was viewed as unfavorable by senior Foreign Office officials, due to their opposition towards "Arab republicanism".

With the two other possible claimants to the throne sidelined by Kirkbride (Prince Nayef and King Faisal II of Iraq), Talal was poised to rule as king of Jordan upon Emir Abdullah's assassination in 1951. As King Talal was receiving medical treatment abroad, Prince Nayef was allowed to act as regent in his brother's place. Soon enough, Prince Nayef began "openly expressing his designs on the throne for himself". Upon hearing of plans to bring King Talal back to Jordan, Prince Nayef attempted to stage a coup d'état by having Colonel Habis Majali, commander of the 10th Infantry Regiment (described by Avi Shlaim as a "quasi-Praetorian Guard"), surround the palace of Queen Zein al-Sharaf (wife of Talal) and "the building where the government was to meet in order to force it to crown Nayef".

The coup, if it was a coup at all, failed due to lack of British support and because of the interference of Glubb Pasha to stop it. Prince Nayef left with his family to Beirut, his royal court advisor Mohammed Shureiki left his post, and the 10th Infantry Regiment was disbanded. King Talal assumed full duties as the successor of Abdullah when he returned to Jordan on 6 September 1951.

== Bibliography ==
- Bickerton, Ian J., and Carla L. Klausner. A Concise History of the Arab-Israeli Conflict. 4th ed. Upper Saddle River: Prentice Hall, 2002.
- Haddad, Jurj Mari (1965). Revolutions and Military Rule in the Middle East: The Arab states pt. I: Iraq, Syria, Lebanon and Jordan. R. Speller. p. 488. ISBN 0-8315-0060-3.
- Jevon, Graham (2017). Glubb Pasha and the Arab Legion: Britain, Jordan and the End of Empire in the Middle East. Cambridge University Press. ISBN 978-1-316-83396-4.
- Morris, Benny (2008). 1948: The History of the First Arab-Israeli War. New Haven: Yale University Press
- Rogan, Eugene L.; Shaim, Avi (2001). The War for Palestine: Rewriting the History of 1948. Cambridge University Press.
- Sela, Avraham (2002). "Abdallah Ibn Hussein". In Sela, Avraham (ed.). The Continuum Political Encyclopedia of the Middle East. New York: Continuum.
- Shlaim, Avi (2007). Lion of Jordan; The life of King Hussein in War and Peace. Allen Lane ISBN 978-0-7139-9777-4
- Wilson, Mary Christina (1990). King Abdullah, Britain and the Making of Jordan. Cambridge University Press. ISBN 0-521-39987-4.
