= Prince Muhammad bin Talal =

Jordanian prince (1940–2021)

Muhammad bin Talal محمد بن طلال
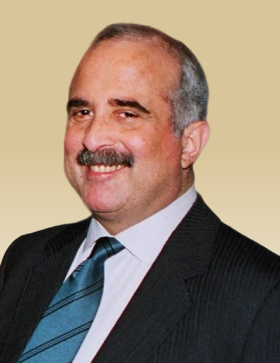

Crown Prince of Jordan
- Tenure: 11 August 1952 – 30 January 1962
- Monarch: Hussein bin Talal
- Predecessor: Hussein bin Talal
- Successor: Abdullah bin Hussein
- Born: 2 October 1940; Amman, Emirate of Transjordan
- Died: 29 April 2021 (aged 80); Amman, Jordan
- Spouse: Firyal Irshaid (m. 1964; div. 1978) Taghrid Majali (m. 1981)
- Issue: Prince Talal; Prince Ghazi
Names
- Muhammad bin Talal bin Abdullah bin Hussein
- House: Hashemite
- Father: Talal of Jordan
- Mother: Zein al-Sharaf
- Religion: Islam

Prince Muhammad bin Talal (2 October 1940 – 29 April 2021) was a member of the Jordanian royal family. He was the second son of King Talal of Jordan and the younger brother of King Hussein of Jordan. He was heir-presumptive to the throne from his elder brother's accession in 1952, until the birth of his nephew (Abdullah) in 1962.

== Education ==
Prince Muhammad completed his primary schooling at the Islamic Scientific College in Amman and then attended the Collège Alpin International Beau Soleil in Switzerland. He then went to Bryanston School, Dorset, in the United Kingdom where he finished his secondary education. Between 1956 and 1957 he attended the Military Academy in Baghdad. In 1960 he earned his private pilot's license.

== Career ==
Upon his return to Jordan in 1958, Prince Muhammad joined the Jordan Arab Army and served in the first Royal Guard Regiment before becoming Aide de Camp to King Hussein. Prince Muhammad was made Crown Prince of Jordan in 1952 when his elder brother Crown Prince Hussein became king. He held the post until 1962.

In 1971, he was appointed head of the council of tribal chiefs by King Hussein. In 1973, a royal decree invested him as the personal representative of King Hussein. He then headed the supreme committee for tourism in Jordan. He also served as regent and as head of the regency council on numerous occasions in the absence of the King. He held the honorary rank of full general in the Jordanian Armed Forces as well as many high decorations from Jordan and other countries.

== Personal life and death ==
Prince Muhammad was born in Amman on 2 October 1940. He first married Firyal Irshaid in 1964. They had two sons: Prince Talal (born 26 July 1965) and Prince Ghazi (born 15 October 1966). Their marriage ended in divorce. In 1981 he married his second wife Taghrid Majali, daughter of Sayyid Hazza' al-Majali a two time Prime Minister of Jordan who was assassinated in 1959 while in office. Prince Muhammad and Princess Taghrid adopted Samiha Al-Fayez, her half-brother Zaid's daughter after Zaid's passing at the early age of 31.

Prince Muhammad died on 29 April 2021 in Amman at the age of 80.

== Honours ==
=== National honours ===
- Grand Cordon of the Order of al-Hussein bin Ali with Collar of Jordan
- Grand Cordon of the Supreme Order of the Renaissance (special class) of Jordan
- Grand Cordon of the Order of Independence (Jordan)
- Grand Cordon of the Order of the Star of Jordan
- Long Service Medal
- Good Conduct Medal
- King Hussein Silver Jubilee Medal-1977
- 1967–1971 Service Medal-1971
- Honorary President of the Royal Jordanian Chess Federation
- Honorary President of the Jordanian Shooting Federation
- Honorary President of the British Federation of Kyokushinkai Karate holding a first Dan and honorary fifth Dan in that martial art.

=== Foreign honours ===
- Denmark : Grand Cross of the Order of the Dannebrog – 27 April 1998
- Ethiopian Empire : Grand Cross of the Order of the Queen of Sheba
- France : Grand Cross of the Order of National Merit
- Italy : Grand Cross of the Order of Merit of the Republic – 26 November 1983
- Japan : Grand Cordon of the Order of the Rising Sun – 1978
- Malaysia : Honorary Grand Commander of the Order of the Defender of the Realm – 24 April 1965
- Morocco : Grand Cordon of the Order of Muhammad – 1950
- Saudi Arabia : Grand Cordon of the Order of Abdulaziz al Saud
- Taiwan : Grand Cordon of the Order of Brilliant Star
- United Kingdom : Honorary Knight Grand Cross of the Royal Victorian Order (GCVO) – 27 March 1984
