= Talal of Jordan =

King of Jordan from 1951 to 1952

Talal bin Abdullah طلال بن عبدالله
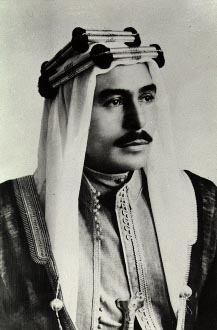
- Talal in 1951

King of Jordan
- Reign: 20 July 1951 – 11 August 1952
- Coronation: 20 July 1951
- Predecessor: Abdullah I
- Successor: Hussein
- Prime ministers: See list: Samir Al-Rifai; Tawfik Abu Al-Huda
- Born: 26 February 1909; Mecca, Hejaz Vilayet, Ottoman Empire
- Died: 7 July 1972 (aged 63); Istanbul, Turkey
- Burial: Raghadan Palace
- Spouse: Zein al-Sharaf bint Jamil (m. 1934)
- Issue: King Hussein; Prince Muhammad; Prince Hassan; Princess Basma
Names
- Talal bin Abdullah al-Hashimi
- House: Hashemite
- Father: Abdullah I of Jordan
- Mother: Musbah bint Nasser
- Religion: Sunni Islam

Talal (Note: Arabic: طلال بن عبد الله, romanized: Ṭalāl bin ʻAbd Allāh) (né Talal bin Abdullah al-Hashimi; 26 February 1909 – 7 July 1972) was King of Jordan from the assassination of his father King Abdullah I in 1951, until his forced abdication in 1952. As a member of the Hashemite dynasty, the royal family of Jordan since 1921, Talal was a 39th-generation direct descendant of Muhammad.

Talal was born in Mecca as the eldest son of Abdullah bin Hussein and his wife Musbah bint Nasser. Abdullah was a son of Sharif Hussein of Mecca, who led the Great Arab Revolt during World War I against the Ottoman Empire in 1916. After removing Ottoman rule, Abdullah established the Emirate of Transjordan in 1921, and ruled as its Emir. During Abdullah's absence, Talal spent his early years alone with his mother. Talal received private education in Amman, later joining Transjordan's Arab Legion as second lieutenant in 1927. He then became aide to his grandfather Sharif Hussein, the ousted king of the Hejaz, during his exile in Cyprus. By 1948, Talal became a general in the Arab Legion.

The country sought independence in 1946, and the Emirate became the Hashemite Kingdom of Jordan. Talal became crown prince upon his father's designation as King of Jordan. Abdullah was assassinated in Jerusalem in 1951, and Talal became the king. Talal's most revered achievement as King is the establishment of Jordan's modern constitution in 1952, rendering his kingdom a constitutional monarchy. He ruled for less than thirteen months until he was forced to abdicate by Parliament because he was experiencing mental illness, reported as schizophrenia. Talal spent the rest of his life at a sanatorium in Istanbul and died there on 7 July 1972. He was succeeded by his eldest son Hussein.

== Early life ==
Talal was born in Mecca as the eldest child of Abdullah, an Arab deputy of Mecca in the Ottoman Parliament, and his wife Musbah bint Nasser. Abdullah was the son of Hussein bin Ali, Sharif of Mecca, traditional steward of the holy cities of Mecca and Medina. Sharif Hussein and his sons led the Great Arab Revolt against the Ottoman Empire in 1916; after removing Ottoman rule, the Sharif's sons established Arab monarchies in place. Abdullah established the Emirate of Transjordan in 1921, a British Protectorate, for which he was Emir. During Abdullah's absence, Talal spent his early years alone with his mother. Talal received private education in Amman, later joining Transjordan's Arab Legion as second lieutenant in 1927. He then became aide to his grandfather Sharif Hussein, the ousted King of the Hejaz, during his exile in Cyprus. By 1948, Talal became a general in the Army.

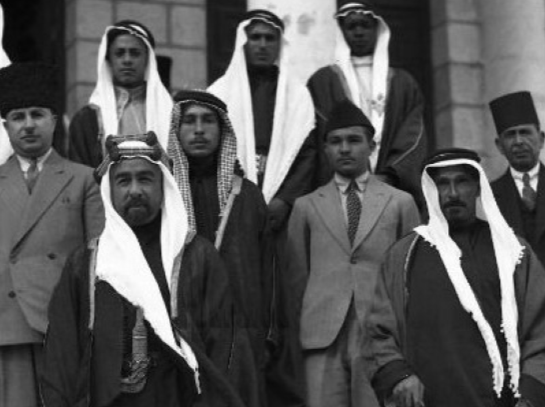
King Abdullah I and Mithqal Pasha with Crown Prince Talal on his wedding day in 1934.

He was educated privately before attending the British Army's Royal Military College, Sandhurst, from which he graduated in 1929 when he was commissioned as a second lieutenant in the Cavalry Regiment of the Arab Legion. His regiment was attached to a British regiment in Jerusalem and also to the Royal Artillery in Baghdad. He married Zein al-Sharaf bint Jamil in November 1934, who bore his first son Hussein in 1935.

== Reign ==
Talal ascended the Jordanian throne after the assassination of his father, Abdullah I, in Jerusalem. Abdullah I was killed by a Palestinian amid rumours that he had been planning to sign a peace treaty with the newly established state of Israel. Talal's son Hussein, who was accompanying his grandfather at Friday prayers, was also nearly a victim. On 20 July 1951, Prince Hussein travelled to Jerusalem to perform Friday prayers at the Al-Aqsa Mosque with his grandfather, King Abdullah I. An assassin, fearing that the king might normalise relations with the State of Israel, killed Abdullah, but the 15-year-old Hussein survived.

During his short reign he was responsible for the formation of a liberalised constitution for the Hashemite Kingdom of Jordan, which made the government collectively, and the ministers individually, responsible to the Jordanian Parliament. The constitution was ratified on 1 January 1952. King Talal is also judged as having done much to smooth the previously strained relations between Jordan and the neighbouring Arab states of Egypt and Saudi Arabia.

Talal has been described by his cousin Prince Ra'ad bin Zeid in a 2002 interview as having "very anti-British sentiments" due to Britain's failure to fully comply with the agreement outlined with his grandfather Sharif Hussein ibn Ali in the McMahon–Hussein correspondence to establish an independent Arab kingdom under his rule. Talal was described by British resident in Transjordan Sir Alec Kirkbride in a 1939 correspondence as being "at heart, deeply anti-British". However, Kirkbride doubted the meaningfulness of this animosity towards the British, owing it purely to the "tension" between Talal and his father Emir Abdullah and Talal's desire to create of himself as a "big nuisance as possible".

Israeli historian Avi Shlaim, however, argues that Talal's hostility towards Britain was genuine as he "bitterly resented British interference in the affairs of his country" and that such sentiments were downplayed by Kirkbride due to his "self-serving" attempt to "protect [Britain's] reputation". Furthermore, at the time of the succession crisis that occurred after King Abdullah I's assassination, Talal was described by contemporary Egyptian and Syrian press as a "great patriotic anti-imperialist" in contrast to his half-brother Naif, who also sought the throne, and was denounced as "weak-minded and entirely subservient to British influence".

A series of stamps bearing King Talal's image were issued to commemorate his ascension to the throne, but were pulled and ultimately burned (with several examples surviving) after he abdicated in 1952. Additionally, there was an attempt to include his image on Jordanian currency in 1951, though no notes are known to have been printed and released for circulation.

== Forced abdication and death ==
A year into Talal's reign, Arab Legion intelligence officer Major Hutson reported that Amman was "seething with a rumour to the effect that the Legion, or Cabinet, intended on handing over West Jordan to Israel and that King Talal was deported by the British for refusing to agree".

At this time, Talal was reported by British resident Furlonge, Queen Zein al-Sharaf (mother of Talal's son and successor Hussein), and Prime Minister Tawfik Abu Al-Huda as experiencing a mental illness. Furlonge particularly suggested that Talal be "forced out of Amman" and "forced into a French clinic". Talal was subsequently flown in a civil (not royal) RAF plane to Paris for "treatment".

Talal's reportedly unwell medical condition is highlighted by an incident on 29 May 1952 when Queen Zein al-Sharaf (described by British historian Nigel J. Ashton as "a sophisticated political operator with her own private communication channels with the British") sought refuge in the British embassy in Paris, claiming that Talal "threatened her with a knife and attempted to kill one of his younger children". Prime Minister Tawfik Abu al-Huda consequently attempted to induce Talal into abdicating; however, he was harshly reproached by Talal, who said he "had no intentions of abdicating". Furthermore, PM Abu al-Huda received reports that Talal was attempting to challenge the government with the help of "private individuals" and an "officer in the Arab Legion".

This led Abu al-Huda into summoning both houses of parliament to an "extraordinary session", requesting their approval of a motion dictating that Talal be deposed for "medical reasons", specifically "schizophrenia". Abu al-Huda backed up his requests with medical reports and argued that Talal's medical condition was irrevocable, and Talal's deposition was unanimously accepted by parliament later that day.

Nationalist officers in the Army suspected that the parliamentary session to discuss Talal's abdication was a plot against him. They asked the King's aide-de-camp, 'Abd Al'Aziz Asfur, to arrange a meeting with him to arrange a response to the supposed plot. However, Asfur returned to the officers and confirmed the claims about his mental condition.

Abu al-Huda proceeded to rule Jordan, from the day of Talal's deposition on 11 August 1952 until Talal's son Hussein came of age on 2 May 1953, in a "dictatorial" fashion. He was described by Glubb Pasha as a "Prime Minister dictator" who had ruled "stably" as Emir Abdullah I had done. Glubb Pasha particularly commended this as he noted that Arab countries were presently "unfit for full democracy on the British model". Abu al-Huda's ascension was supported by Political Resident Furlonge as Abu al-Huda was from the "old guard" and thus "accustomed to the existing system and relationship with Britain".

Contrary to his wish to live in Saudi-ruled Hejaz after his abdication, Talal was sent to live the latter part of his life at a sanatorium in Istanbul and died there on 7 July 1972. Talal is buried in the Royal Mausoleum at the Raghadan Palace in Amman.

== Legacy ==
Despite his short reign, he is revered for having established a modern constitution of Jordan.

== Personal life ==
In 1934, Talal married his first cousin Zein al-Sharaf who bore him four sons and two daughters:

- King Hussein (14 November 1935 – 7 February 1999).
- Princess Asma, died at birth in 1937.
- Prince Muhammad (2 October 1940 – 29 April 2021).
- Prince Hassan (born 20 March 1947).
- Prince Muhsin, deceased.
- Princess Basma (born 11 May 1951).

== Gallery ==
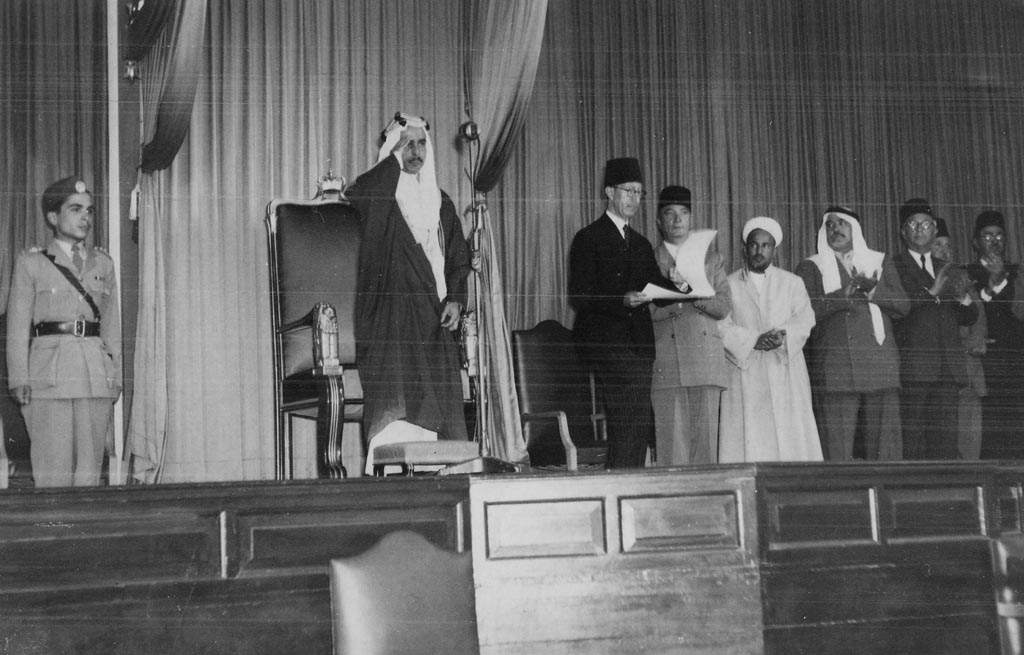
During the 1951 opening of the Jordanian Parliament. Also present are Prince Hussein (1st from left) and Prime Minister Tawfik Abu Al-Huda (3rd from left).

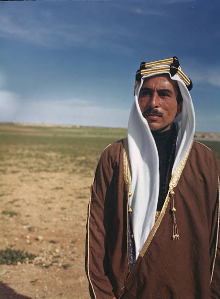
As a Crown Prince in 1948.

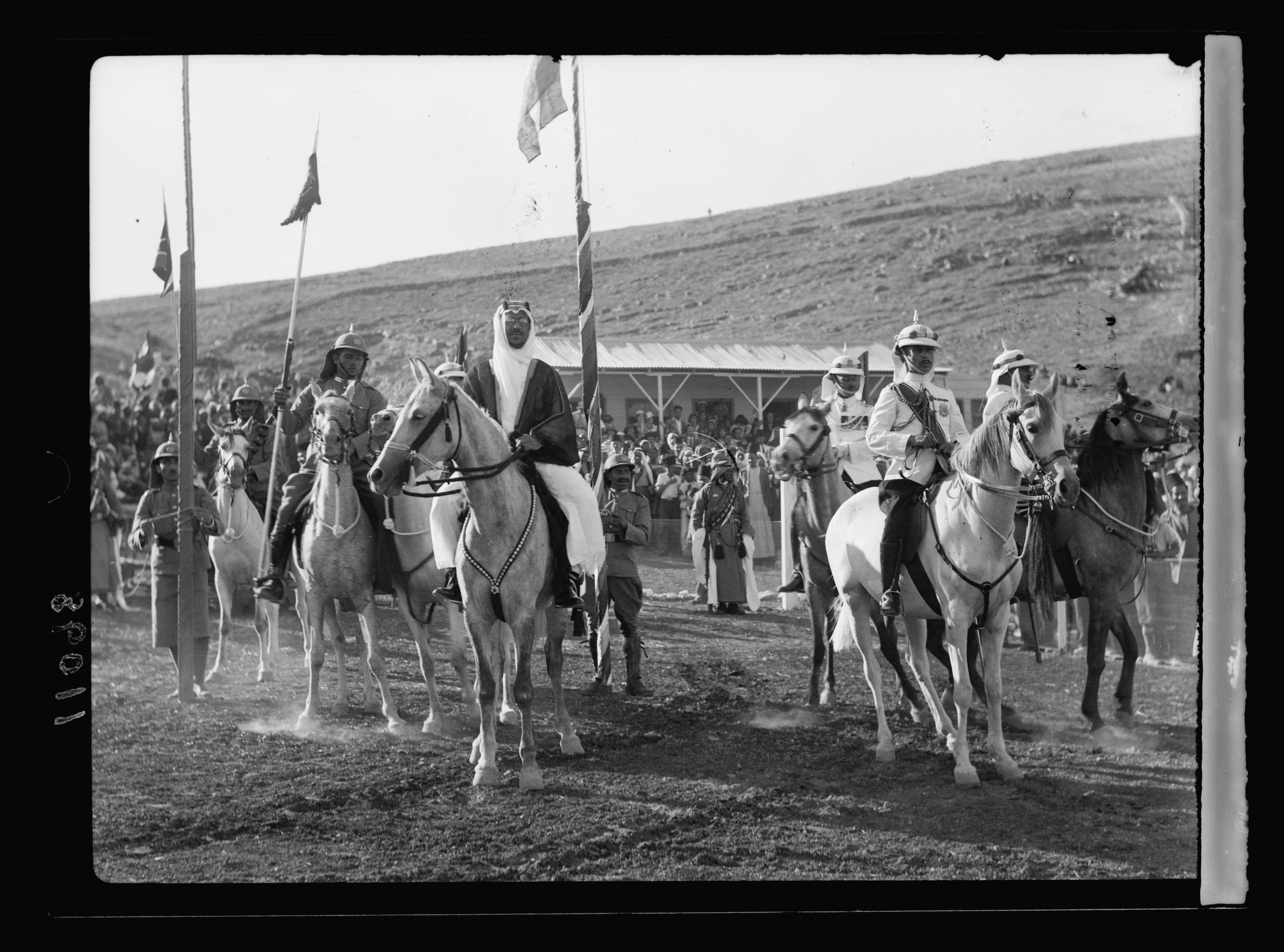
King Talal (mounted, right of center) and King Saud of Saudi Arabia (mounted, left of center)

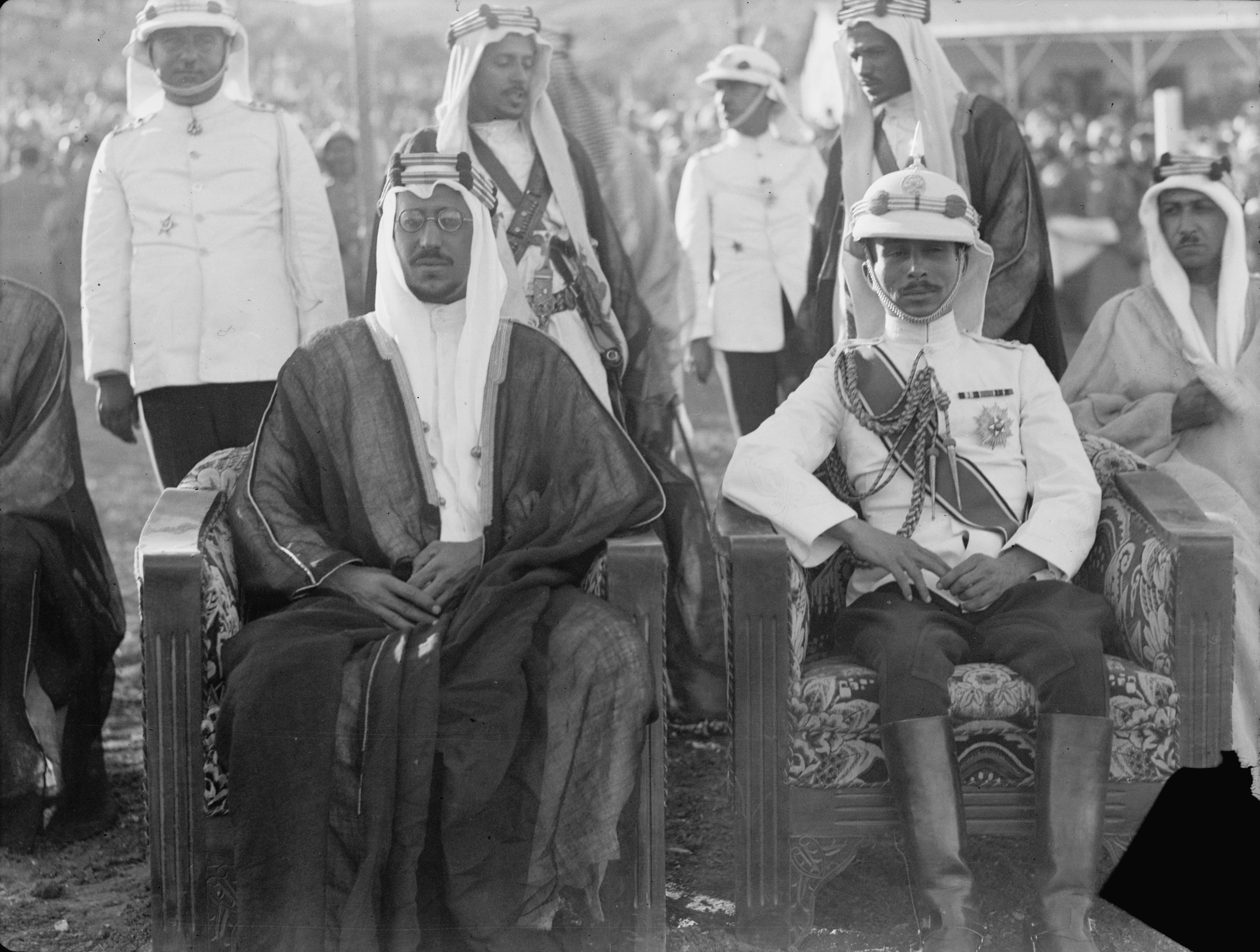
King Talal (right) and King Saud (left). Both would later be forced to abdicate.

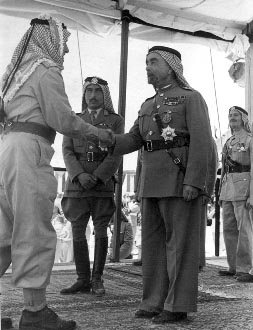
King Talal (2nd from left) with his father King Abdullah I (2nd from right) in 1946

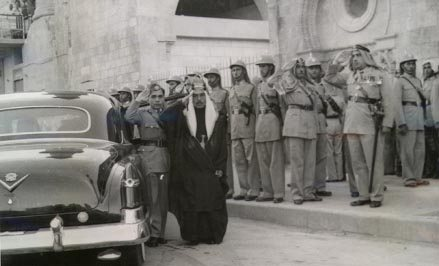
King Talal of Jordan and his son King Hussein in 1952

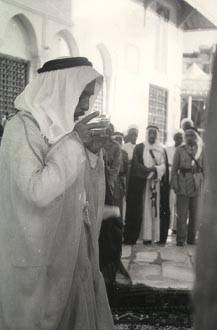
Drinking Zamzam water in Mecca in 1951.

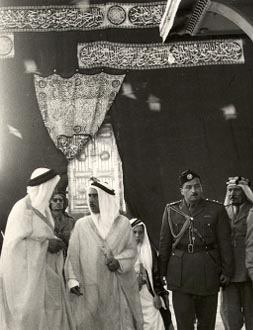
In front of the Kaaba, 1951.

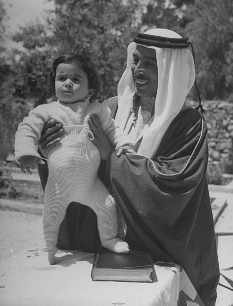
With his son Prince Hassan in 1948.

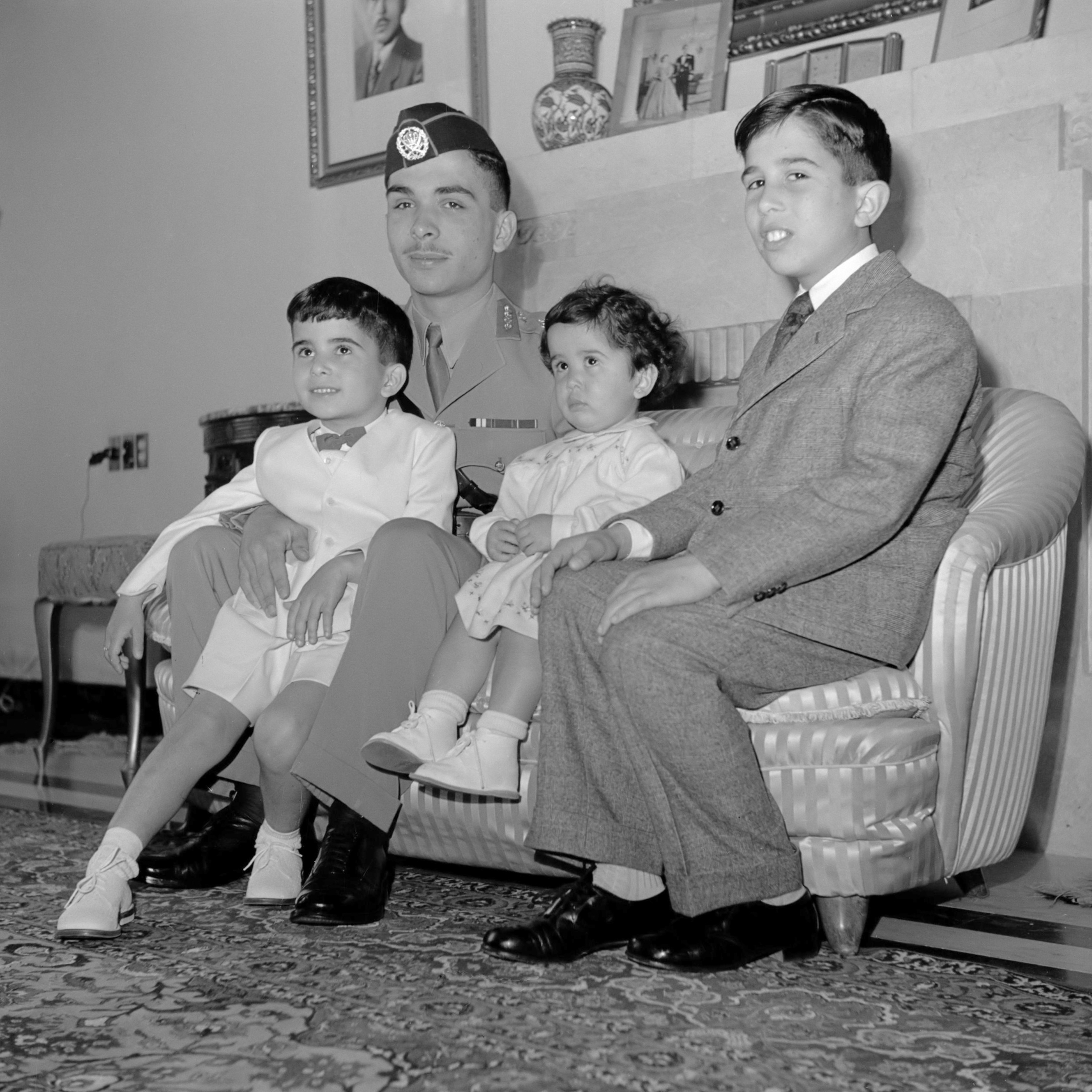
King Talal's children. From left to right: Prince Hassan, Prince Hussein, Princess Basma and Prince Muhammad

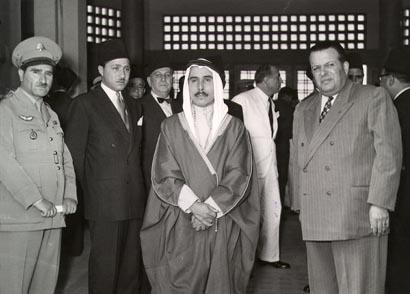
In Lebanon, 1952

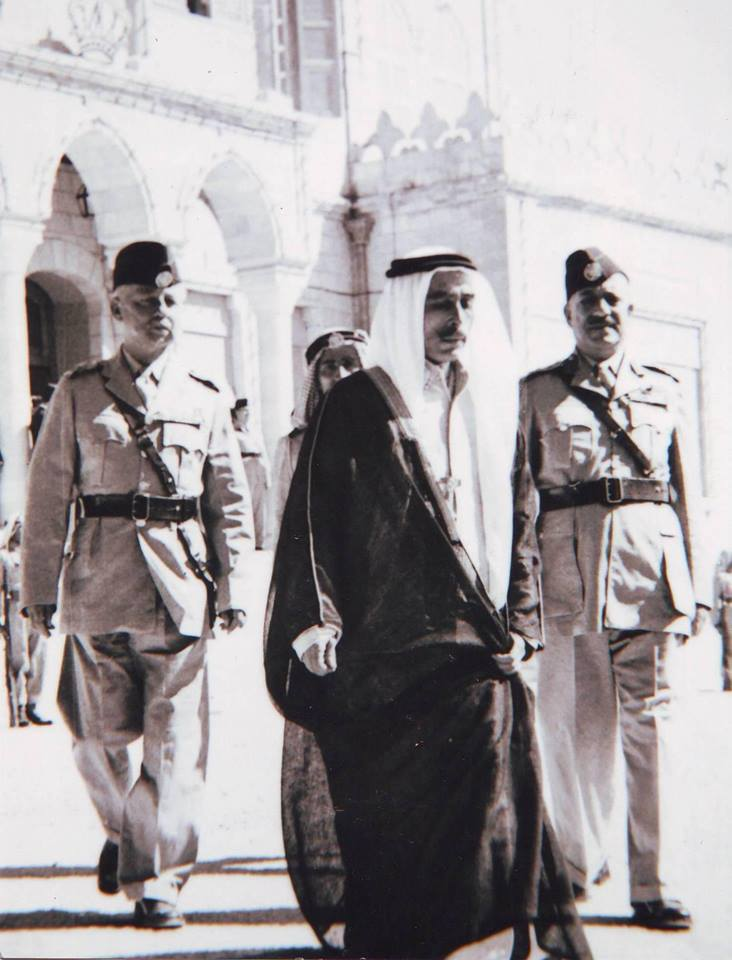
With Glubb Pasha (1st from left) in 1952.

== See also ==
- Hashemites
- List of kings of Jordan
- King Abdullah I
- King Hussein

== Bibliography ==
- Salibi, Kamal (15 December 1998). The Modern History of Jordan. I.B. Tauris. ISBN 9781860643316.

Talal of Jordan House of Hashim Born: 26 February 1909
Regnal titles
Preceded by Abdullah I	King of Jordan; 1951–1952	Succeeded by Hussein
