= Raghadan Palace =

Crown palace in Amman, Jordan

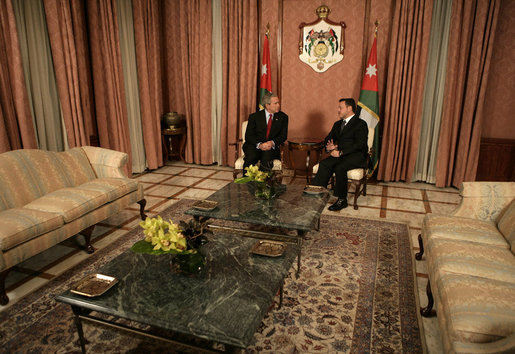
- President George W. Bush and Jordan's King Abdullah II meeting at Raghadan Palace, 2006
- Interactive map of the Raghadan Palace area

General information
- Type: Palace
- Location: Jordan
- Coordinates: 31°57′36″N 35°57′0″E

Raghadan Palace (Arabic: قصر رغدان, romanized: Qaṣr Raġadān), the first Hashemite structure in Jordan, was built by King Abdullah I, the founding monarch of the country. Upon his arrival in Amman, King Abdullah I initially resided in a modest Ottoman-style house near the Roman Theater. He also used a hilltop area in Marka to welcome delegations and host celebrations.

Following successful negotiations with the British authorities, resulting in their recognition of an independent government in Eastern Jordan, King Abdullah I selected an elevated location in 1924 to construct an official royal residence overlooking downtown Amman. This coincided with the first Hashemite restoration. The palace was named "Raghadan", symbolizing prosperity and comfort, and embodied hope and optimism. The design of the palace was intended to reflect both grandeur and simplicity, while harmonizing with the historical significance of the city. The palace's stained glass windows were inspired by the style of Al-Aqsa Mosque.

== Location ==
Raghadan Palace is situated at the end of a plateau extending westward, known as "Al-Tahthur", a term that refers to large accumulations of stones. Historically, Jabal Al-Qal'a (the Citadel) in Amman was part of the Al-Tahtur area before the restoration and reconstruction of the Citadel's historical remains.

Over the years, the palace has been referred to by various names, including the Grand Palace, the High Headquarters, the Amiri Court, and the Hashemite Court. Eventually, it became known as the Royal Hashemite Court, encompassing the royal palaces and their associated administrative and organizational offices.

== Architectural construction ==
Historical records show that the construction of Raghadan Palace took three years, starting in 1924 and finishing in 1927 (99 years ago), at a total cost of 1,600 Palestinian pounds. The palace's first official event was a gathering where Prince Abdullah I hosted poets. The architectural design of the palace was influenced by Islamic styles, with contributions from architects from Damascus, Nablus, and Jerusalem. They focused on highlighting the palace's grandeur, particularly the eastern façade, which features lilies, spearheads, arched windows, carved columns, and a grand entrance.

The palace is surrounded by a large wall that connects to Jabal Al-Qal'a (the Citadel). From the central Hashemite Square, the city's stone walls can be seen running along the hill where the palace stands, extending toward the ruins of the ancient citadel on Jabal Al-Tahtur. This site was once home to a temple and marketplace with paved streets. Between 1931 and 1934, the Amman municipality planted forest trees around the palace, enhancing the area's natural landscape.

== Government house ==
Raghadan Palace is recognized as the first Hashemite residence and the central seat of governance in Jordan. It serves as the heart of political activity in the country, where decisions on state affairs, foreign relations, and royal decrees are made. The palace is the site where governments are appointed, honors and titles are conferred, royal pardons are issued, and treaties and agreements are signed. Beyond its political significance, Raghadan Palace has a rich cultural history as a center for literature and poetry, where King Abdullah I, the founding monarch, hosted prominent poets and literary figures.

Among the notable poets and writers who frequented Raghadan Palace are Omar Abu Risha, Abdelmunim Rifai, Taysir Dhibyan, Nadeem Al-Mallah, Hosni Fariz, Muhammad Abu Ghneima, Badi' Al-Bustani, Muhammad Al-Shanqeeti, Hamza Al-Arabi, Abdul Mohsen Al-Kathimi, Fouad Al-Khatib, Kamel Shoaib Al-Amili, Diya Al-Din Al-Rifai, and Arar (Mustafa Wahbi Al-Tal).

During times of crisis in the Arab world, Raghadan Palace also served as a refuge for Arab nationalists. In 1939, it hosted Arab political and nationalist gathering, during which poets Mustafa Wahbi Tal and Fouad Al-Khatib recited their works. These historic literary sessions were later compiled in a book titled Sessions in Raghadan by Dr.Youssef Heikal.

== Palace structure ==
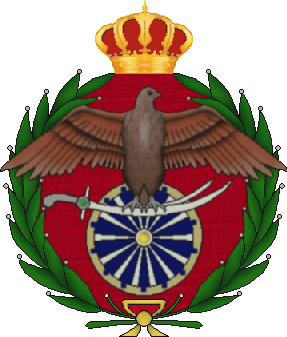
This emblem was designed at the request of founding King Abdullah I to be the nation's official emblem.

The entrance to Raghadan Palace is through the main gate, which opens onto the central courtyard. This entrance leads to a staircase ascending to a high-roofed terrace that stands before an ancient wooden door. Above this door, the official emblem of the Hashemite Kingdom of Jordan is displayed. This emblem was established by Executive Council Decision No. 558, issued by the Parliament of Jordan on August 25, 1934. The design of the emblem dates back to 1921, when King Abdullah I sought to create an official symbol for the newly established Jordanian state.

Raghadan Palace is distinguished by its gray stone construction, with the stones sourced from Ma'an. Its architecture was designed by skilled architects from Damascus, Nablus, and Jerusalem. The palace's completion was commemorated by the poet Salim Al-Hanafi, who inscribed verses of poetry authored by Saeed Al-Karmi on the ceiling of the main hall.

Visitors to Raghadan Palace enter through the main door into a rectangular hall, which serves as a central point providing access to the various chambers of the palace. To the right, a small room features a raised wooden prayer platform made of beech wood, with a barniz wood floor. It is believed that King Abdullah I, the founding monarch, often spent time in this room for worship and reflection. This room leads to another rectangular hall adorned with elaborate curtains and intricately designed ceilings. The hall contains a round table with wooden chairs, used for meetings and gatherings.

On the left, visitors enter the office of King Abdullah I, which includes a reception area. The office originally housed a library, which has since been relocated to preserve its collection. Adjacent to the office is a spacious hall, known for its ornate ceiling decorations. As visitors move through the main hall, they ascend a staircase that splits into two directions. While ascending, they are greeted by a glass panel covering the central arch of the palace, decorated with intricate artistic designs.

== Throne room ==
When visitors enter the Throne Hall, they are greeted by an entrance made of wood and glass, framed with polished marble and white alabaster. This entrance leads into a spacious, elevated area dominated by a grand oval-shaped iwan (niche). The backdrop of the iwan features stained glass windows that add to the hall’s grandeur. On a slightly raised platform rests the Hashemite Throne, with a table beside it, adorned with a finely carved wooden corner piece in traditional Arab decorative style. This corner serves to hold the Quran and the Book of Honors. To the right of the throne stands the flag of Jordan, while to the left is the Hashemite flag, representing the King of the Hashemite Kingdom of Jordan.

The construction of the Throne Hall was completed in 1927 (1343 AH). This hall played a role in Jordanian history, witnessing the official ceremony of pledging allegiance to King Abdullah I bin Al-Hussein as ruler. It also hosted the coronation ceremony of King Abdullah II bin Al-Hussein. The total cost of building the hall amounted to 1,600 Palestinian pounds, with Prince Abdullah I personally contributing 700 pounds, which was deducted over seven months from his personal allowances.

== Other halls in the palace ==
The upper floors of Raghadan Palace contain multiple halls accessible through entrances on the right and left of the Throne Hall. These halls are designated for meetings, receptions, dining, and hospitality, as well as housing private offices for managing state affairs. Throughout the palace, glass showcases and cabinets built into the walls display swords and various items gifted to the Hashemite kings.

Additionally, the palace includes a special room dedicated to Sharif Hussein bin Ali, who returned to reside in Raghadan Palace in 1930. Suffering from illness and exhaustion, he died on June 3, 1931. Notably, the two wooden chairs used by Sharif Hussein bin Ali remain in their original place to this day.

== In literature ==
- Arar's poem greeting Abd al-Rahman Shahbandar in 1939.
- Abdul Mohsen Al-Kazemi visited Raghadan Palace in 1927 and composed a poem during his visit.
- Muhammad Kamel al-Ameli composed a poem during his visit to Raghadan Palace.
