= Abdullah I of Jordan =

Ruler of Jordan from 1921 to 1951

Abdullah I عبد الله الأول
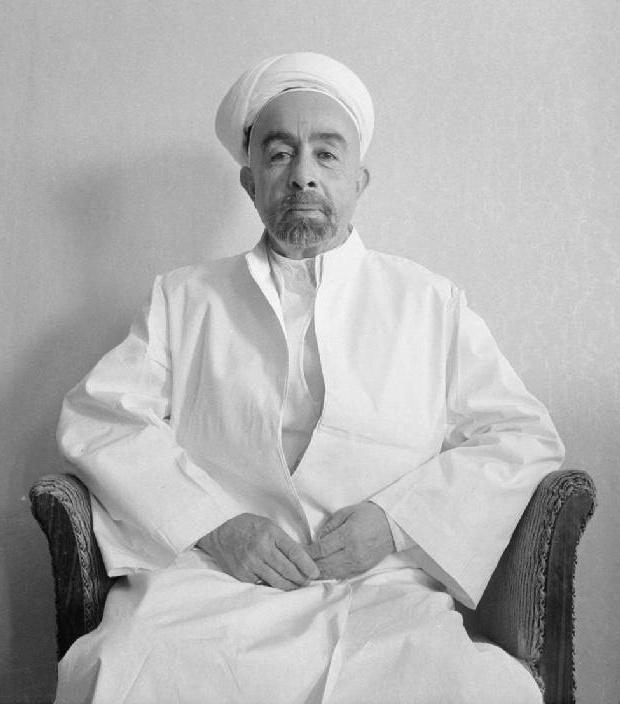
- 1942 portrait

King of Jordan
- Reign: 25 May 1946 – 20 July 1951
- Predecessor: Himself as Emir of Transjordan
- Successor: Talal
- Prime ministers: See list: Ibrahim Hashem; Samir Al-Rifai; Tawfik Abu Al-Huda; Sa'id Mufti

Emir of Transjordan
- Reign: 11 April 1921 – 25 May 1946
- Predecessor: Office established
- Successor: Himself as King of Jordan
- Prime ministers: See list: Rashid Talaa; Mazhar Raslan; Ali al-Rikabi; Hasan Abu Al-Huda; Abd Allah Siraj; Ibrahim Hashem; Tawfik Abu Al-Huda; Samir Al-Rifai
- Born: 2 February 1882; Mecca, Hejaz Vilayet, Ottoman Empire
- Died: 20 July 1951 (aged 69); East Jerusalem, West Bank, Jordan
- Cause of death: Assassination (gunshot wounds)
- Burial: Raghadan Palace, Amman, Jordan
- Spouses: Musbah bint Nasser (m. 1904) Suzdil Khanum (m. 1913) Nahda bint Uman (m. 1949)
- Issue: Princess Haya; King Talal; Princess Munira; Prince Nayef; Princess Maqbula; Princess Naifeh
Names
- Abdullah bin Hussein al-Hashimi
- House: Hashemite
- Father: Hussein bin Ali
- Mother: Abdiyya bint Abdullah
- Religion: Sunni Islam
- Military career
- Allegiance: Kingdom of Hejaz (1916–1921); Emirate of Transjordan (1921–1946); Jordan (1946–1951)
- Branches: Sharifian Army; Arab Legion; Royal Jordanian Army
- Service years: 1916–1951
- Rank: Brigadier General 1916 -1921; Commander in Chief 1921–1951
- Wars: Arab Revolt (1916–1918); Kura rebellion (1921); Adwan Rebellion (1923); Anglo-Iraqi War (1941); Syria–Lebanon campaign (1941); First Arab–Israeli War (1948)

Abdullah I (Note: Arabic: عبد الله الأول, romanized: ʿAbd Allāh al-Awwal.) (né Abdullah bin Hussein al-Hashimi; (Note: Arabic: عبد الله بن الحسين, romanized: ʿAbd Allāh bin al-Ḥusayn.) 2 February 1882 – 20 July 1951) was the ruler of Jordan from 11 April 1921 until his assassination in 1951. He was the Emir of Transjordan, a British protectorate, until 25 May 1946, after which he was king of an independent Jordan. As a member of the Hashemite dynasty, the royal family of Jordan since 1921, Abdullah was a 38th-generation direct descendant of Muhammad.

Born in Mecca, Hejaz, Ottoman Empire, Abdullah was the second of four sons of Hussein bin Ali, Sharif of Mecca, and his first wife, Abdiyya bint Abdullah. He was educated in Istanbul and Hejaz. From 1909 to 1914, Abdullah sat in the Ottoman legislature, as deputy for Mecca, but allied with Britain during the First World War. During the war, he played a key role in secret negotiations with the United Kingdom that led to the Arab Revolt against Ottoman rule that was led by his father Sharif Hussein. Abdullah personally led guerrilla raids on garrisons.

Abdullah became Emir of Transjordan in April 1921. He upheld his alliance with the British during World War II, and became king after Transjordan gained independence from the United Kingdom in 1946. In 1950, Jordan annexed the West Bank, which angered Arab countries including Syria, Saudi Arabia and Egypt. He was assassinated in Jerusalem while attending Friday prayers at the entrance of the Al-Aqsa Mosque by a Palestinian in 1951. Abdullah was succeeded by his eldest son Talal.

== Early political career ==
In their Revolt and their Awakening, Arabs never incited sedition or acted out of greed, but called for justice, liberty and national sovereignty.

— Abdullah about the Great Arab Revolt

In 1910, Abdullah persuaded his father to stand, successfully, for Grand Sharif of Mecca, a post for which Hussein acquired British support. In the following year, he became deputy for Mecca in the parliament established by the Young Turks, acting as an intermediary between his father and the Ottoman government. In 1914, Abdullah paid a clandestine visit to Cairo to meet Lord Kitchener, the United Kingdom's Secretary of State for War, to seek British support for his father's ambitions in Arabia.

Abdullah maintained contact with the British throughout the First World War and in 1915 encouraged his father to enter into correspondence with Sir Henry McMahon, British high commissioner in Egypt, about Arab independence from Turkish rule (see McMahon–Hussein Correspondence). This correspondence in turn led to the Arab Revolt against the Ottomans. During the Arab Revolt of 1916–18, Abdullah commanded the Arab Eastern Army. Abdullah began his role in the Revolt by attacking the Ottoman garrison at Ta'if on 10 June 1916.

The garrison consisted of 3,000 men with ten 75-mm Krupp guns. Abdullah led a force of 5,000 tribesmen, but they did not have the weapons or discipline for a full attack. Instead, he laid siege to town. In July, he received reinforcements from Egypt in the form of howitzer batteries manned by Egyptian personnel. He then joined the siege of Medina commanding a force of 4,000 men based to the east and north-east of the town.

In early 1917, Abdullah ambushed an Ottoman convoy in the desert, and captured £20,000 worth of gold coins that were intended to bribe the Bedouin into loyalty to the Sultan. In August 1917, Abdullah worked closely with the French Captain Muhammand Ould Ali Raho in sabotaging the Hejaz Railway. Abdullah's relations with the British Captain T. E. Lawrence were not good, and as a result, Lawrence spent most of his time in the Hejaz serving with Abdullah's brother, Faisal, who commanded the Arab Northern Army.

== Founding of the Emirate of Transjordan ==
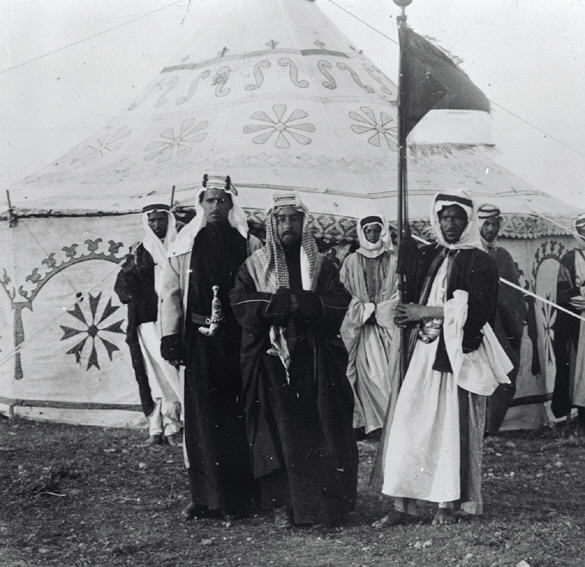
Abdullah arrives in Amman 1920

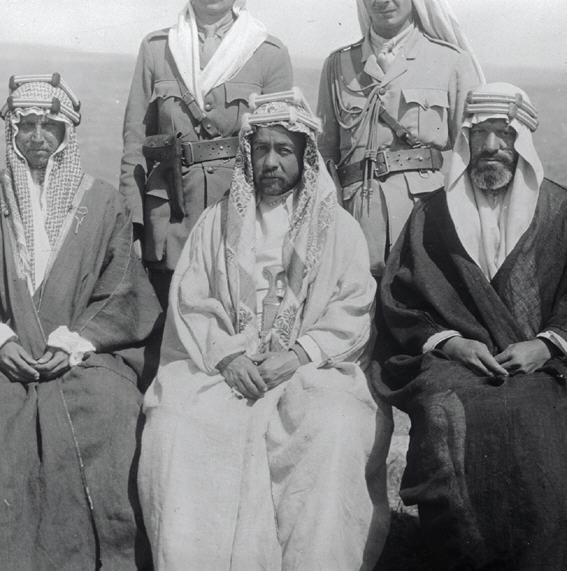
Abdullah 1920

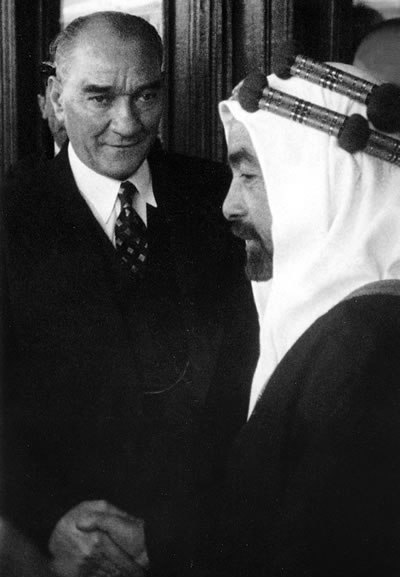
Abdullah I of Transjordan during the visit to Turkey with Turkish president Mustafa Kemal 1937

On 8 March 1920, Abdullah was proclaimed King of Iraq by the Iraqi Congress but he refused the position. After his refusal, his brother Faisal who had just been defeated in Syria, accepted the position. When French forces captured Damascus after the Battle of Maysalun (24 July 1920) and expelled his brother Faisal (27 July–1 August 1920), Abdullah moved his forces from Hejaz into Transjordan with a view to liberating Damascus, where his brother had been proclaimed King in 1918.

Having heard of Abdullah's plans, Winston Churchill invited Abdullah to Cairo in 1921 for a famous "tea party", where he convinced Abdullah to stay put and not attack Britain's allies, the French. Churchill told Abdullah that French forces were superior to his and that the British did not want any trouble with the French. Abdullah headed to Transjordan and established an emirate there on 11 April 1921 after being welcomed into the country by its inhabitants.

Although Abdullah established a legislative council in 1928, its role remained advisory, leaving him to rule as an autocrat. Prime ministers under Abdullah formed 18 governments during the 23 years of the Emirate.

Abdullah set about the task of building Transjordan with the help of a reserve force headed by Lieutenant-Colonel Frederick Peake, who was seconded from the Palestine police in 1921. The force, renamed the Arab Legion in 1923, was led by John Bagot Glubb between 1930 and 1956. During World War II, Abdullah was a faithful British ally, maintaining strict order within Transjordan, and helping to suppress a pro-Axis uprising in Iraq. The Arab Legion assisted in the occupation of Iraq and Syria.

== Expansionist aspirations ==
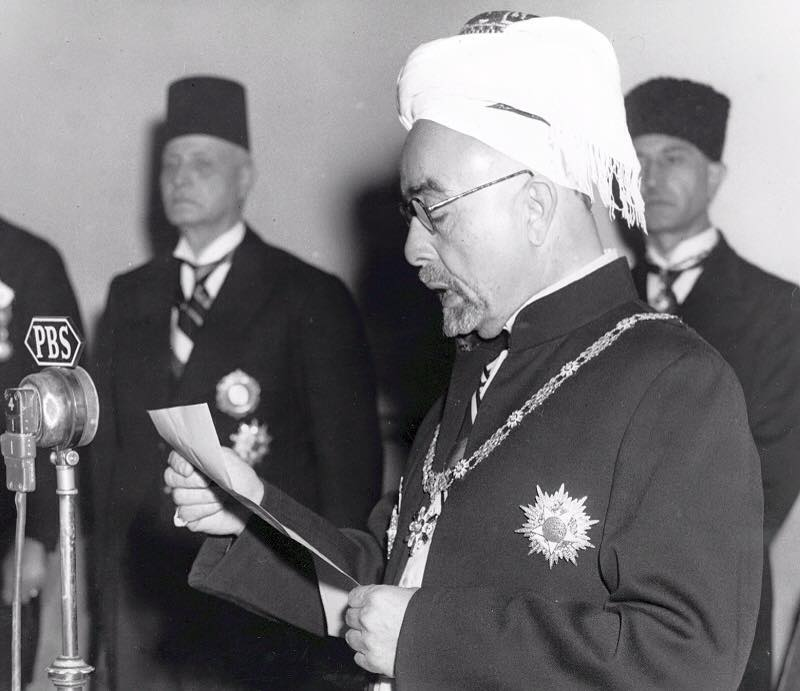
King Abdullah declaring the end of the British Mandate and the independence of the Hashemite Kingdom of Jordan, 25 May 1946.

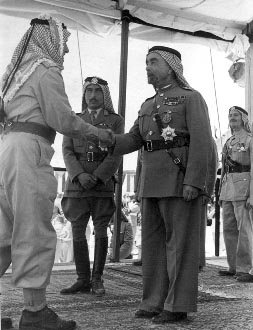
The Independence of Jordan

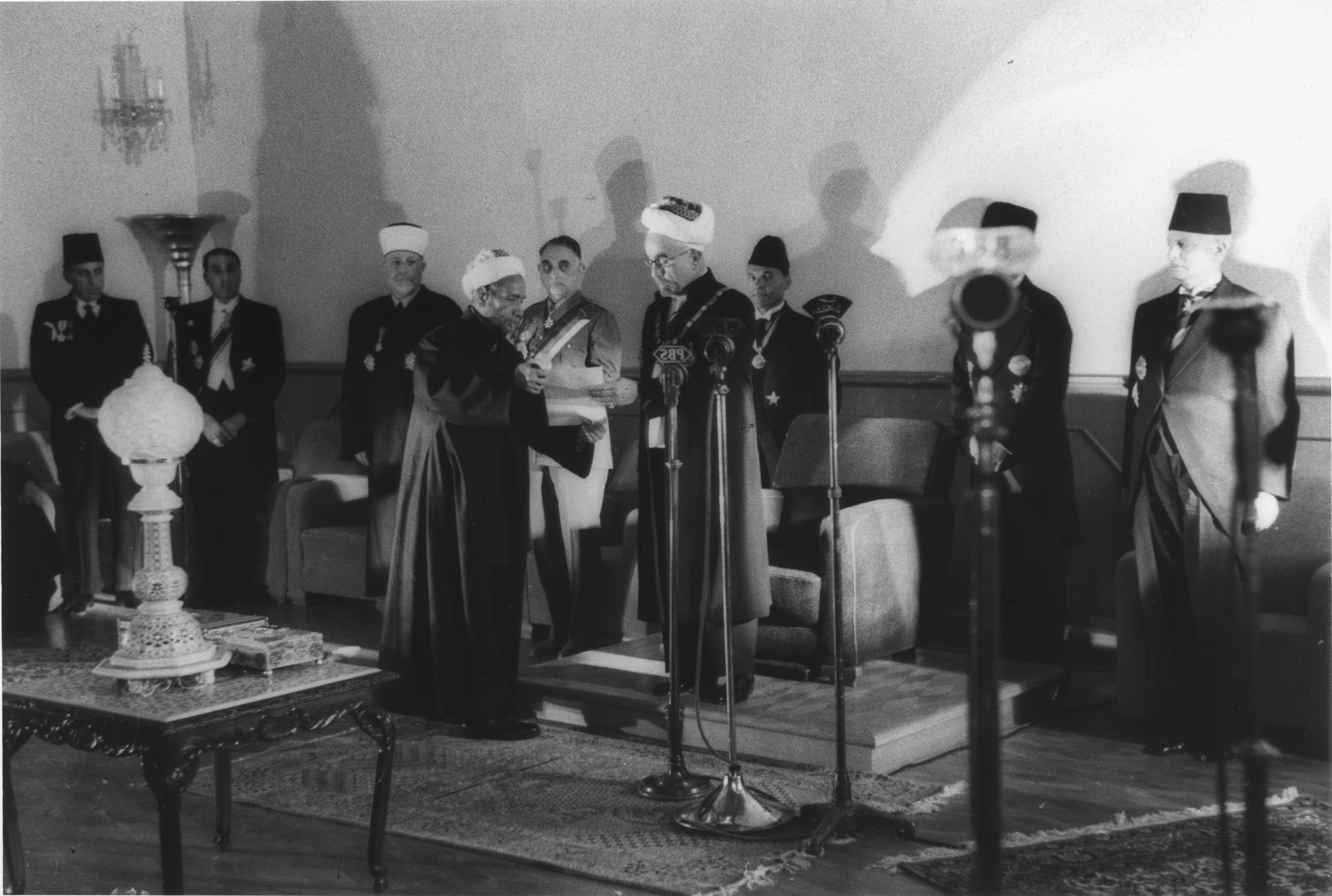
King Abdullah I of Jordan after Jordanian independence 1946

Abdullah negotiated with Britain to gain independence. On 25 May 1946, the Hashemite Kingdom of Transjordan (renamed the Hashemite Kingdom of Jordan on 26 April 1949) was proclaimed independent. On the same day, Abdullah was crowned king in Amman.

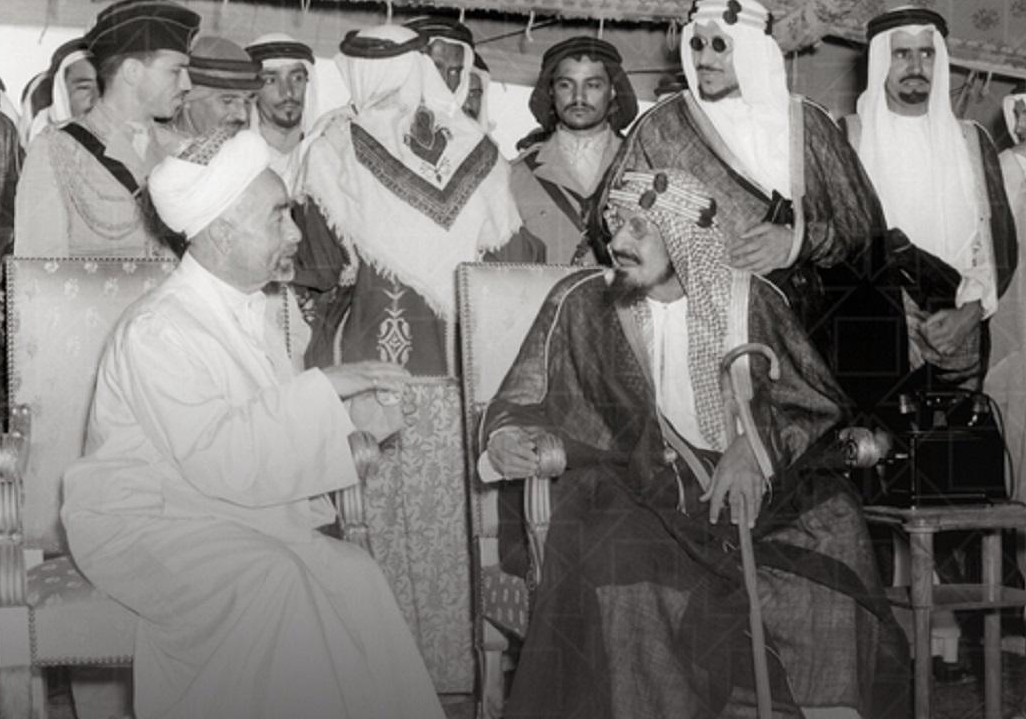
King Abdullah I of Transjordan and King Abdulaziz of Saudi Arabia in 1947

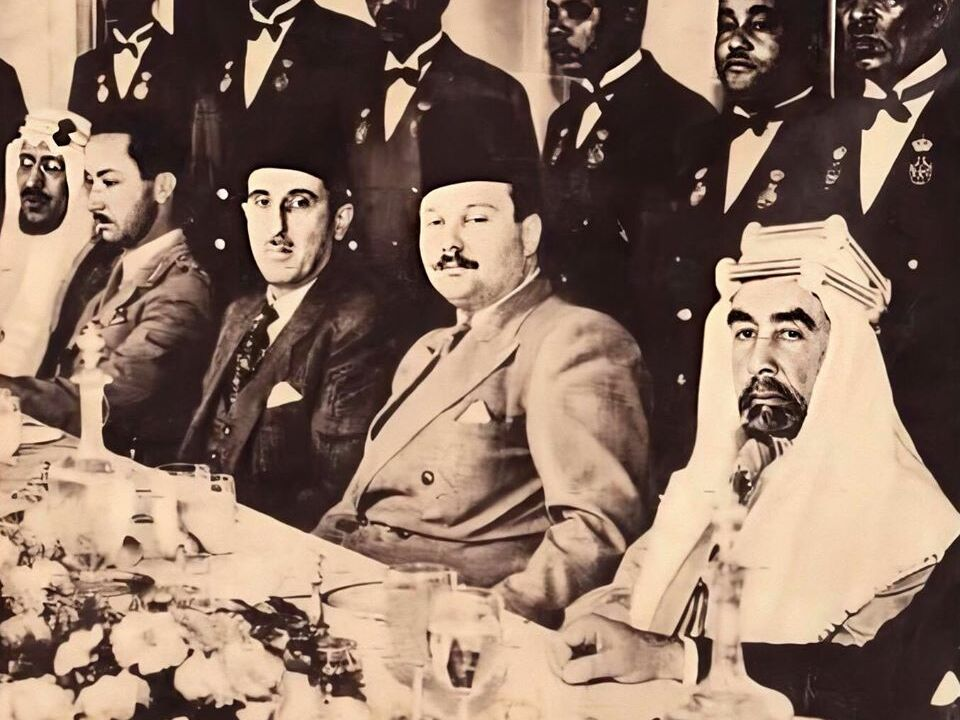
King Abdullah I of Transjordan and King Farouk I of Egypt

Abdullah, alone among the Arab leaders of his generation, was considered a moderate by the West. It is possible that he might have been willing to sign a separate peace agreement with Israel, but for the Arab League's militant opposition. Because of his dream for a Greater Syria within the borders of what was then Transjordan, Syria, Lebanon, and Palestine under a Hashemite dynasty with "a throne in Damascus," many Arab countries distrusted Abdullah and saw him as both "a threat to the independence of their countries and they also suspected him of being in cahoots with the enemy" and in return, Abdullah distrusted the leaders of other Arab countries.

Abdullah supported the Peel Commission in 1937, which proposed that Palestine be split up into a small Jewish state (20 percent of the British Mandate for Palestine) and the remaining land be annexed into Transjordan. The Arabs within Palestine and the surrounding Arab countries objected to the Peel Commission while the Jews accepted it reluctantly. Ultimately, the Peel Commission was not adopted. In 1947, when the UN supported partition of Palestine into one Jewish and one Arab state, Abdullah was the only Arab leader supporting the decision.

In 1946–48, Abdullah supported partition in order that the Arab allocated areas of the British Mandate for Palestine could be annexed into Transjordan. Abdullah went so far as to have secret meetings with the Jewish Agency for Israel. Future Israeli prime minister Golda Meir was among the delegates to these meetings that came to a mutually agreed upon partition plan independently of the United Nations in November 1947.

On 17 November 1947, in a secret meeting with Golda Meir, Abdullah stated that he wished to annex all of the Arab parts as a minimum, and would prefer to annex all of Palestine. This partition plan was supported by British Foreign Secretary Ernest Bevin who preferred to see Abdullah's territory increased at the expense of the Palestinians rather than risk the creation of a Palestinian state headed by the Mufti of Jerusalem Mohammad Amin al-Husayni.

Historian Graham Jevon discusses the Shlaim and Karsh interpretations of the critical meeting and accepts that there may not have been a "firm agreement" as posited by Shlaim while claiming it is clear that the parties openly discussed the possibility of a Hashemite-Zionist accommodation and further says it is "indisputable" that the Zionists confirmed that they were willing to accept Abdullah's intention.

On 4 May 1948, Abdullah, as a part of the effort to seize as much of Palestine as possible, sent in the Arab Legion to attack the Israeli settlements in the Etzion Bloc. Less than a week before the outbreak of the 1948 Arab–Israeli War, Abdullah met with Meir for one last time on 11 May 1948. Abdullah told Meir, "Why are you in such a hurry to proclaim your state? Why don't you wait a few years? I will take over the whole country and you will be represented in my parliament. I will treat you very well and there will be no war".

Abdullah proposed to Meir the creation "of an autonomous Jewish canton within a Hashemite kingdom," but "Meir countered back that in November, they had agreed on a partition with Jewish statehood." Depressed by the unavoidable war that would come between Jordan and the Yishuv, one Jewish Agency representative wrote, "[Abdullah] will not remain faithful to the 29 November [UN Partition] borders, but [he] will not attempt to conquer all of our state [either]." Abdullah too found the coming war to be unfortunate, in part because he "preferred a Jewish state [as Transjordan's neighbour] to a Palestinian Arab state run by the mufti."

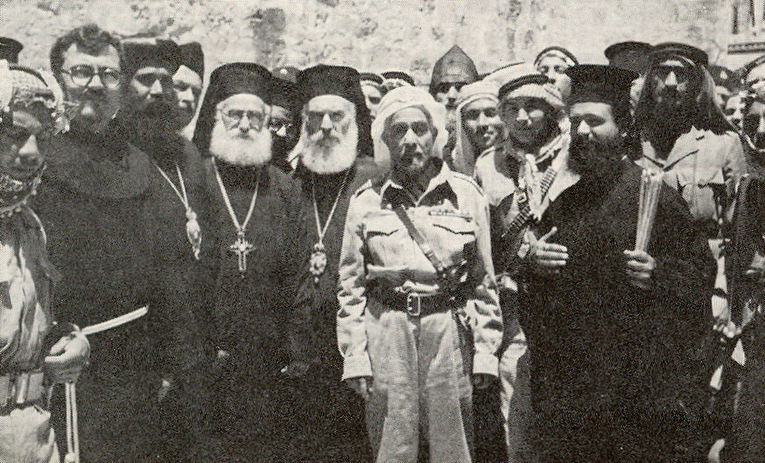
King Abdullah welcomed by Palestinian Christians in East Jerusalem on 29 May 1948, the day after his forces took control over the city.

The Palestinian Arabs, the neighbouring Arab states, the promise of the expansion of territory and the goal to conquer Jerusalem finally pressured Abdullah into joining them in an "all-Arab military intervention" on 15 May 1948. He used the military intervention to restore his prestige in the Arab world, which had grown suspicious of his relatively good relationship with Western and Jewish leaders. Abdullah was especially anxious to take Jerusalem as compensation for the loss of the guardianship of Mecca, which had traditionally been held by the Hashemites until Ibn Saud seized the Hejaz in 1925.

Abdullah's role in this war became substantial. He distrusted the leaders of the other Arab nations and thought they had weak military forces; the other Arabs distrusted Abdullah in return. He saw himself as the "supreme commander of the Arab forces" and "persuaded the Arab League to appoint him" to this position. His forces under their British commander Glubb Pasha did not approach the area set aside for the Jewish state, though they clashed with the Yishuv forces around Jerusalem, intended to be an international zone. According to Abdullah el-Tell it was the King's personal intervention that led to the Arab Legion entering the Old City against Glubb's wishes.

On 16 July 1951, Riad Al Solh, former prime minister of Lebanon, was assassinated in Amman, where rumours were circulating that Lebanon and Jordan were discussing a joint separate peace with Israel.

== Assassination ==
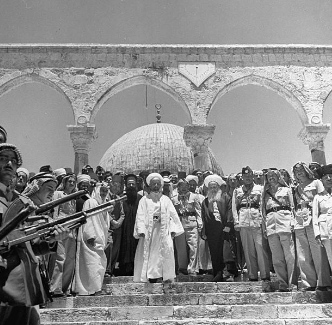
Visiting the Dome of the Rock, 1948

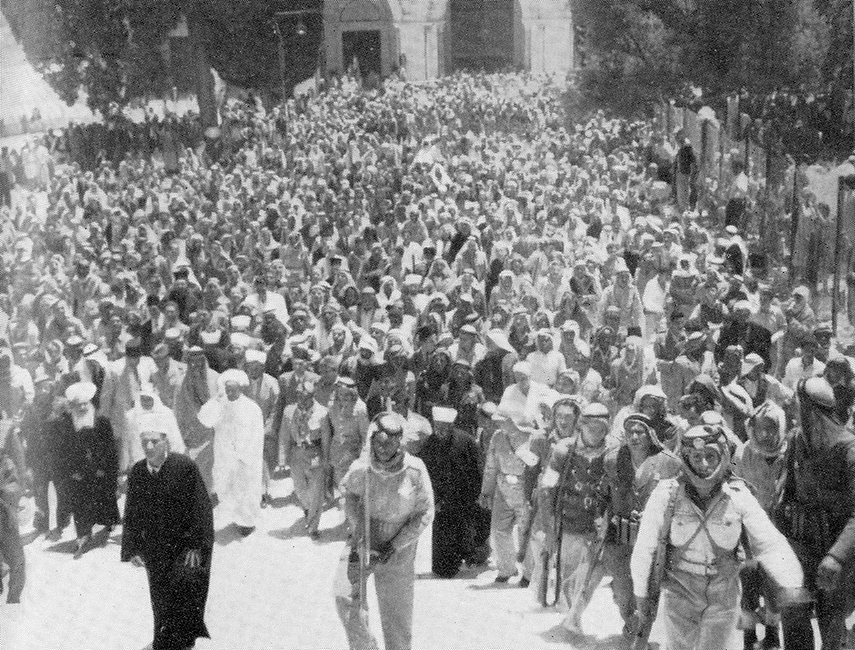
King Abdullah, in white, leaving the Al-Aqsa Mosque compound a few weeks before his assassination, July 1951

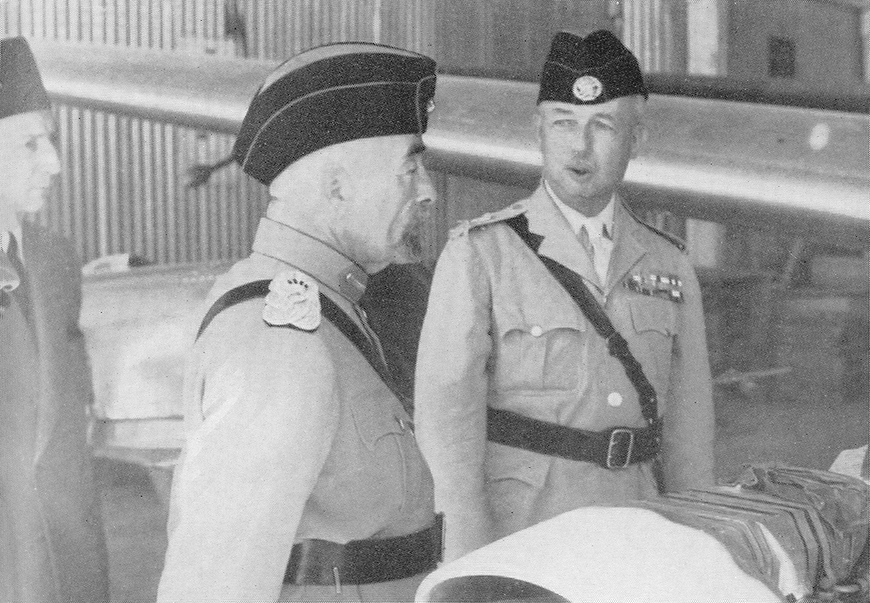
King Abdullah with Glubb Pasha, the day before Abdullah's assassination, 19 July 1951

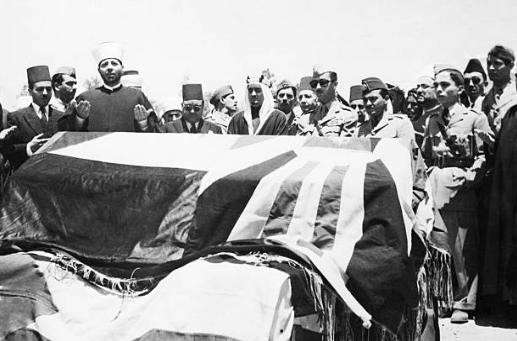
Abdullah's coffin with mourners.

On 20 July 1951, King Abdullah of Jordan was assassinated while visiting Al-Aqsa Mosque in Jerusalem by Mustafa Shukri Ashu, a Palestinian tailor's apprentice associated with a Palestinian nationalist group seeking an independent Palestinian state. Abdullah, who was accompanied by his grandson Prince Hussein, was shot during Friday prayers, with three bullets hitting his head and chest. Prince Hussein survived when a medal he wore deflected a bullet.

The assassination was attributed to a secret group linked to the Muslim Brotherhood with political ties to Amin al-Husseini, the former Grand Mufti of Jerusalem. The assassin was shot dead by Abdullah's guards, and several individuals, including Colonel Abdullah at-Tell and members of the Husseini family, were later implicated in the plot. Abdullah's reign was followed by the reign of his son Talal (r.1951-1952), and thereafter by that of Talal's son Hussein (r.1952-1999). Abdullah's assassination is thought to have influenced Hussein's decision not to pursue peace talks with Israel after the Six-Day War. However, King Hussein remained interested in a Jordanian-Palestinian federation throughout his reign - proposing a federation of Jordan, the West Bank, and East Jerusalem in 1972; and reaching a secret agreement with Israel on the matter in 1987. Despite the interest of Israeli leadership (notably including Shimon Peres), Palestinian unification with Jordan was opposed by Palestinian nationalist factions including the PLO, and the 1987 agreement failed to materialise largely due to the start of the First Intifada later that year.

== Marriages and children ==
Abdullah married three times.

In 1904, Abdullah married his first wife, Sharifa Musbah bint Nasser (1884 – 15 March 1961), at Stinia Palace, İstinye, Istanbul, Ottoman Empire. She was a daughter of Emir Nasser Pasha and his wife, Dilber Khanum. They had three children:

- Princess Haya (1907–1990). Married Abdul-Karim Ja'afar Zeid Dhaoui.
- King Talal (26 February 1909 – 7 July 1972).
- Princess Munira (1915–1987). Never married.

In 1913, Abdullah married his second wife, Suzdil Khanum (d. 16 August 1968), in Istanbul, Turkey. They had two children:

- Prince Nayef bin Abdullah (14 November 1914 – 12 October 1983; a colonel of the Royal Jordanian Land Force. Regent for his older half-brother, Talal, from 20 July to 3 September 1951). Married in Cairo or Amman on 7 October 1940 Princess Mihrimah Sultan (11 November 1922 – March 2000, Amman, and buried in Istanbul on 2 April 2000), daughter of the Ottoman prince, Şehzade Mehmed Ziyaeddin (1873–1938) and his fifth consort, Neşemend Hanım (1905–1934), and paternal granddaughter of Mehmed V through his first consort.
- Princess Maqbula (6 February 1921 – 1 January 2001); married Hussein ibn Nasser, Prime Minister of Jordan (terms 1963–64, 1967).

In 1949, Abdullah married his third wife, Nahda bint Uman, a lady from Anglo-Egyptian Sudan, in Amman. They had one child:

- Princess Naifeh bint Abdullah (born 1950). Married Sameer Hilal Ashour.

== Honours ==
- United Kingdom: Honorary Knight Commander of the Order of St Michael and St George in the 1927 Birthday Honours.
- Francoist Spain: Grand Cross of the Order of Military Merit, with white distinctive, 1949.

== Bibliography ==
- Alon, Yoav. The Shaykh of Shayks: Mithqal al-Fayiz and Tribal Leadership in Modern Jordan, Stanford Univ. Press, 2016.
- Bickerton, Ian J., and Carla L. Klausner. A Concise History of the Arab-Israeli Conflict. 4th ed. Upper Saddle River: Prentice Hall, 2002.
- Corboz, Elvire (2015). Guardians of Shi'ism: Sacred Authority and Transnational Family Networks. Edinburgh University Press. ISBN 978-0-7486-9144-9.
- Dayan, Moshe (1976). Moshe Dayan: Story of My Life: An Autobiography. William Morrow & Co. ISBN 0-688-03076-9.
- Encyclopædia Britannica (Macropaedia) (2010). Abdullah. Vol. I (15th ed.). Chicago: Encyclopædia Britannica Inc. p. 22. ISBN 978-1-59339-837-8.
- Encyclopaedia Britannica (online). "Abdullah I: Biography, History, & Assassination". Encyclopædia Britannica.
- Haddad, Jurj Mari (1965). Revolutions and Military Rule in the Middle East: The Arab states pt. I: Iraq, Syria, Lebanon and Jordan. R. Speller. p. 488. ISBN 0-8315-0060-3.
- Hiro, Dilip (1996). "Abdullah ibn Hussein al Hashem". Dictionary of the Middle East. New York: St. Martin's Press. pp. 3–4.
- Jevon, Graham (2017). Glubb Pasha and the Arab Legion: Britain, Jordan and the End of Empire in the Middle East. Cambridge University Press. ISBN 978-1-316-83396-4.
- Karsh, Efraim (September 1996). "Historical Fictions". Middle East Quarterly. 3 (3): 55–60. Archived from the original on 7 February 2013.
- Karsh, Efraim (2002). The Arab-Israeli Conflict: The Palestine War 1948. London: Osprey. ISBN 1-4728-9518-5. No Google Books access.
  - see also the 2014 Bloomsbury Publishing edition, ISBN 978-1472810014
- Karsh, Efraim (2003). Arafat's War: The Man and His Battle for Israeli Conquest. New York: Grove Press. ISBN 978-0-8021-4158-3.
- Lunt, James (1990) [1989 (Macmillan)]. Hussein of Jordan. Fontana/Collins. pp. 7–8. See also W. Morrow 1989 edition, ISBN 0688064981, books.google.com/books?id=TYctAQAAIAAJ.
- Morris, Benny (2008). 1948: The History of the First Arab-Israeli War. New Haven: Yale University Press
- Murphy, David (2008). The Arab Revolt 1916–18: Lawrence sets Arabia ablaze. London: Osprey. ISBN 978-1-84603-339-1.
- Oren, Michael (2003). Six Days of War: June 1967 and the Making of the Modern Middle East. New York: Ballantine. ISBN 0-345-46192-4 pp. 5, 7.
- Rogan, Eugene L.; Shaim, Avi (2001). The War for Palestine: Rewriting the History of 1948. Cambridge University Press.
- The War for Palestine... (2nd ed.). Cambridge University Press. 2007. ISBN 978-0-521-87598-1.
  - Shlaim, Avi. "Israel and the Arab coalition in 1948". pp. 79–103.
  - Rogan, Eugene L. "Jordan and 1948: the persistence of an official history". pp. 104–124.
  - Tripp, Charles. "Iraq and the 1948 War: mirror of Iraq's disorder". pp. 125–150.
  - Landis, Joshua. "Syria and the Palestine War: fighting King 'Abdullah's 'Greater Syria plan'". pp. 178–205.
- Rogan, Eugene (2012). The Arabs: A History. Basic Books. ISBN 978-0-465-03248-8.
- Salibi, Kamal S. (1998). The Modern History of Jordan. I.B. Tauris. p. 93. ISBN 978-1-86064-331-6.
- Sela, Avraham, ed. (2002). The Continuum Political Encyclopedia of the Middle East. New York: Continuum.
  - Sela, "Abdallah Ibn Hussein". pp. 13–14.
  - "al-Husseini, Hajj (Muhammad) Amin". pp. 360–362.
- Shlaim, Avi (1988). Collusion across the Jordan: King Abdullah, the Zionist movement, and the partition of Palestine. Columbia University Press. ISBN 978-0-231-06838-3. OCLC 876002691.
- Shlaim, Avi (1990). The Politics of Partition; King Abdullah, the Zionists and Palestine 1921–1951 . Columbia University Press. ISBN 0-231-07365-8.
- Shlaim, Avi (2007). Lion of Jordan; The life of King Hussein in War and Peace. Allen Lane ISBN 978-0-7139-9777-4
- Thornhill, Michael T. (2004). Abdullah ibn Hussein (1882–1951). Oxford Dictionary of National Biography, Oxford University Press; online edn, Jan 2008. Retrieved 10 March 2009.
- Wilson, Mary Christina (1990). King Abdullah, Britain and the Making of Jordan. Cambridge University Press. ISBN 0-521-39987-4.

Preceded by Office established	Emir of Transjordan under the British Mandate; 1921–46	Succeeded by Himself as King of Transjordan
Preceded by Himself as Emir of Transjordan	King of Jordan; 1946–51 (titled as King of Transjordan 1946–49)	Succeeded by Talal
