= Princess Salma bint Abdullah =

Jordanian princess (born 2000)

Princess Salma
- Born: 26 September 2000 (age 26); King Hussein Medical Center, Amman, Jordan
Names
- Salma bint Abdullah bin Hussein bin Talal
- House: Hashemite
- Father: Abdullah II of Jordan
- Mother: Rania Al-Yassin
- Education: International Academy Amman; Royal Military Academy Sandhurst
- Alma mater: University of Southern California (BA)
- Military career
- Allegiance: Jordan
- Branch: Royal Jordanian Air Force
- Service years: 2018–present
- Rank: Flight Lieutenant

Princess Salma bint Abdullah (Arabic: سلمى بنت عبدالله; born 26 September 2000) is the second daughter and third child of King Abdullah II and Queen Rania of Jordan.

== Early life and education ==
Princess Salma bint Abdullah was born at King Hussein Medical Center on 26 September 2000 in Amman, Jordan. She is the third child and second daughter of King Abdullah II and Queen Rania. She is part of the Hashemite family. Salma has two elder siblings, Crown Prince Hussein and Princess Iman, and one younger brother, Prince Hashem.

Princess Salma attended the International Amman Academy (IAA) and graduated from the IAA on 22 May 2018. In May 2023, she graduated from the University of Southern California with a Bachelor of Arts degree in archaeology.

== Military training and career ==
In November 2018, Princess Salma graduated from the Royal Military Academy Sandhurst's short commissioning course program. She was commissioned into the Jordanian Armed Forces as a second lieutenant on 24 November 2018. She became the first female jet pilot in the Jordanian Armed Forces in 2020. In December 2023, Salma, a first lieutenant in the Royal Jordanian Air Force, joined an aid flight to resupply the 41-bed Jordanian field hospital in northern Gaza.

== Public appearances and activities ==
In February 2015, Princess Salma and Prince Hashem participated in a tree-planting initiative in honor of Jordanian pilot Muath al-Kasasbeh at a public park in Amman. In July 2017, Princess Salma accompanied her father on a state visit to France. In September 2017, the Jordanian Army Radio reported that Princess Salma participated in a protest against U.S. President Donald Trump's decision to recognize Jerusalem as the capital of Israel. In June 2021, on behalf of her father King Abdullah II, Princess Salma inaugurated the Military Women’s Training Centre in Zarqa. In January 2024, Salma and Princess Iman accompanied their mother Queen Rania on a meeting with a group of young people held at the House of Roses Ladies Association in Aqaba. In February 2024, Princess Salma attended a match between Jordan and Tajikistan at the 2023 AFC Asian Cup. In August 2026, Princess Salma accompanied her father and her brother Prince Hashem on a diplomatic visit to China, including a meeting with Chinese President Xi Jinping.
