= Princess Iman bint Abdullah =

Jordanian princess (born 1996)

Princess Iman
- Born: 27 September 1996 (age 29); Amman, Jordan
- Spouse: Jameel Alexander Thermiótis (m. 2023)
- Issue: Amina Thermiótis; Talia Thermiótis; Rania Thermiótis
Names
- Iman bint Abdullah bin Hussein bin Talal
- House: Hashemite
- Father: Abdullah II of Jordan
- Mother: Rania Al-Yassin
- Education: International Academy Amman; Walsh School of Foreign Service; Parsons School of Design

Princess Iman bint Abdullah (Arabic: إيمان بنت عبدالله; born 27 September 1996) is a Jordanian princess, the first daughter and second child of King Abdullah II and Queen Rania of Jordan.

== Early life and education ==
Princess Iman was born on 27 September 1996 at King Hussein Medical Center in Amman, Jordan. She is the second child of King Abdullah II and Queen Rania. She is a member of the Hashemite family. Her paternal grandfather was the then-reigning King Hussein, and her grandmother is Princess Muna, who was born in Britain and was King Hussein’s second wife. Princess Iman’s elder brother is Crown Prince Hussein, and her younger siblings are Princess Salma and Prince Hashem.

Princess Iman completed her secondary education at the International Academy Amman in 2014. She then enrolled at Georgetown University’s Edmund A. Walsh School of Foreign Service, where she pursued studies in international affairs before transferring to Parsons School of Design. She graduated with a Bachelor of Business Administration degree in Strategic Design and Management.

== Personal life ==
On 6 July 2022, the Royal Hashemite Court announced the engagement of Princess Iman to Venezuelan Jameel Alexander Thermiótis (born on 28 April 1994 in Caracas). He is the eldest of three children of Geórgios Aléxandros Thermiótis (1961) and his wife, María Corina Hernández (1975). Jameel is a businessman of Greek descent. He co-founded Outbound Ventures, a technology investment firm in New York City. His paternal grandfather, Jimmy Thermiotis (1922–2018); a native of Andros, was one of the richest Greeks in Venezuela and was responsible for the franchise in that country of the Dior house. The couple were married on 12 March 2023 at Beit Al Urdun Palace. On 16 February 2025, she gave birth to their first child, a daughter named Amina. On 14 August 2026, they welcomed twin daughters Rania and Talia.
