= Hussein, Crown Prince of Jordan =

Heir apparent to the Jordanian throne (born 1994)

Hussein bin Abdullah
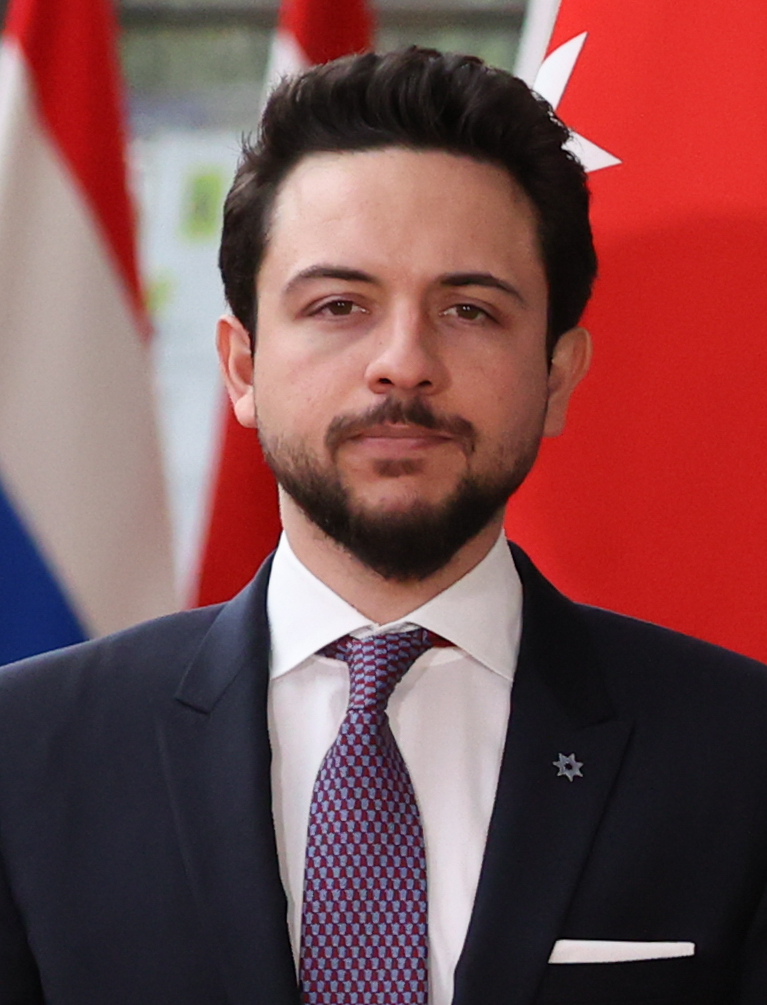
- Hussein in 2023

Crown Prince of Jordan
- Tenure: 2 July 2009 – present
- Monarch: Abdullah II
- Predecessor: Hamzah bin Hussein (in 2004)
- Born: 28 June 1994 (age 32); Amman, Jordan
- Spouse: Rajwa Al Saif (m. 2023)
- Issue: Princess Iman
Names
- Hussein bin Abdullah bin Hussein bin Talal
- House: Hashemite
- Father: Abdullah II of Jordan
- Mother: Rania Al-Yassin
- Religion: Sunni Islam
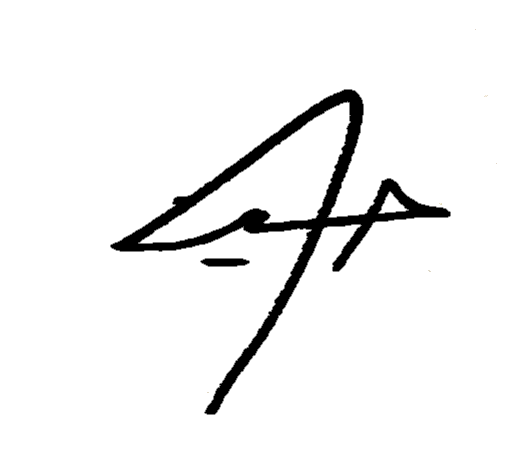
- Signature
- Military career
- Branch: Royal Jordanian Army
- Service years: 2012–present
- Rank: Major

Hussein bin Abdullah al-Hashimi (Note: Arabic: الحسين بن عبد الله, romanized: Ḥusayn ibn ʿAbd Allāh) (born 28 June 1994) is Crown Prince of Jordan as the eldest son of King Abdullah II and Queen Rania. He is a member of the House of Hashim, the royal family of Jordan since 1921, and is considered to be a 42nd-generation direct descendant of the Islamic prophet Muhammad.

Hussein is currently a major in the Jordanian Armed Forces. He served as a regent on several occasions and has accompanied his father on a number of local and international visits. Hussein also represented Jordan at international forums including the United Nations Security Council, United Nations General Assembly, United Nations Climate Change Conference, and the World Economic Forum. He began his education in Jordan, and, in 2016, graduated from Georgetown University with a degree in International History. In 2015, at the age of 20, Hussein became the youngest person to chair a UN Security Council session. After graduating from Sandhurst in 2017, he made a global debut when he addressed the UN General Assembly in September of that year.

Hussein is in charge of the Crown Prince Foundation, which is responsible for a technical university and a number of scientific and humanitarian initiatives. He also champions the National Council for Future Technology, a body dedicated to advancing Jordan's technological standing, and leads several initiatives to promote tourism and technical education and vocational training in Jordan. In 2023, he married Rajwa Al-Saif, with whom he has a daughter, Princess Iman.

== Early life and education ==
Hussein was born on 28 June 1994 at King Hussein Medical Center in Amman to the then-Prince Abdullah and Princess Rania. Hussein is the namesake of his grandfather, King Hussein. Hussein claims descent in the male line from Muhammad's daughter Fatimah and Ali, the fourth caliph. The Hashemites ruled Mecca for over 700 years until its 1925 conquest by the House of Saud, and have ruled Jordan since 1921. The Hashemites are the oldest-ruling dynasty in the Muslim world, and are the second-oldest-ruling dynasty in the world, after the Imperial House of Japan. His paternal grandmother, Princess Muna, is an English convert to Islam, and his mother is of Palestinian descent.

Crown Prince Hussein is the eldest child of King Abdullah and Queen Rania, and he was born during the reign of his paternal grandfather, King Hussein. Crown Prince Hussein has three siblings: Princess Iman, Princess Salma and Prince Hashem. Hussein started his primary education at the International School of Choueifat and the International Academy Amman; he finished his high school at King's Academy in 2012, obtained a bachelor's degree in International History at Georgetown University in 2016, and graduated from the Royal Military Academy Sandhurst in 2017. He is a major in the Jordanian Armed Forces.

== Heir apparent ==
Royal Standard of the Crown Prince of Jordan

Abdullah was not expected to succeed to the throne despite being King Hussein's eldest son; King Hussein had appointed his own younger brother Prince Hassan - Abdullah's uncle - as heir designate in 1965. Shortly before King Hussein's death on 7 February 1999, the King replaced Hassan with Abdullah. When Abdullah became king, he named his younger half-brother, Prince Hamzah, as heir designate on his accession.

On 28 November 2004, King Abdullah removed Hamzah from his title as crown prince. Though the title of crown prince was left vacant, the Constitution of Jordan provides for agnatic primogeniture: the monarch's eldest son is automatically first in the line of succession to the Jordanian throne unless decreed otherwise. Crown Prince Hussein thus became heir apparent as soon as his half-uncle lost the status. Analysts widely expected King Abdullah to bestow the formal title on Hussein. The title was conferred on 2 July 2009 when a royal decree naming him as crown prince, effective immediately, was issued.

== Official duties ==
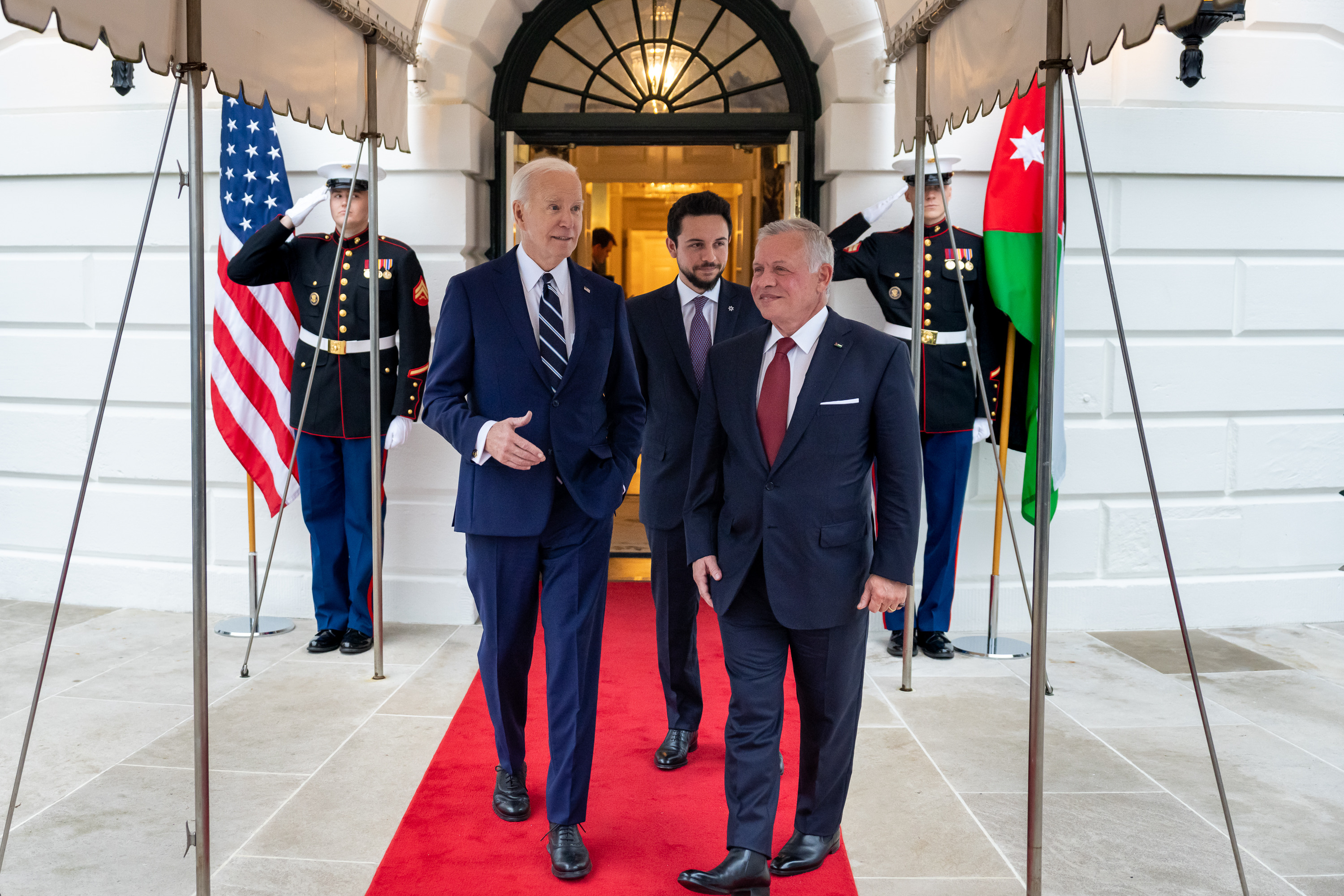
The Crown Prince and the King met with U.S. President Joe Biden in Washington, D.C., February 2024

Unlike the King's role, that of the Crown Prince is mostly ceremonial under the Constitution and the title is not associated with any political post. Hussein performed his first official engagement in June 2010, when he represented his father at the celebrations of the anniversary of the Arab Revolt and the Armed Forces Day.

Crown Prince Hussein has served his father on both official and military missions, and has served several times as regent during the King's absence from the country. Hussein is in charge of the Crown Prince Foundation, which is responsible for a technical university and a number of scientific & humanitarian initiatives. The foundation established the Haqiq initiative, which aims to encourage youth for volunteerism; a NASA internship program; MASAR initiative to encourage space technology innovation; and the Hearing Without Borders initiative that funds cochlear implants for Jordanians with impaired hearing. The interns from the NASA program built a cubesat (mini satellite) named JY1, Jordan's first satellite that launched from California in 2018. The cubesat project was named after the late King Hussein's amateur radio callsign.

In 2013, Crown Prince Hussein participated in a training session with the members of the Jordanian special forces elite 71st Counter Terrorism Battalion. On 14 July 2014, Hussein visited the King Hussein Medical Center in Amman where injured Palestinians who fled Gaza were receiving medical treatment.

On 23 April 2015, the then-20-year-old Prince Hussein became the youngest person ever to chair a UN Security Council session. During the meeting, the prince oversaw a debate about methods of preventing young people from joining extremist groups. Ban Ki-moon, the then-Secretary-General of the United Nations, said Hussein is "not yet 21 years old, but he is already a leader in the 21st century". The Security Council unanimously adopted Resolution 2250 titled "Maintenance of international peace and security"; the resolution was presented at the initiative of Jordan during the session Hussein presided over.

In May 2017, Hussein made the welcoming speech during a session of the World Economic Forum that was held on the Jordanian shores of the Dead Sea. In September 2017, after having graduated from Sandhurst, he gave Jordan's speech at the UN General Assembly.

In December 2025, Hussein was seen personally driving Indian Prime Minister Narendra Modi to Jordan Museum during Modi's visit to Jordan.

== Personal life ==
The Crown Prince's Instagram account has 5.3 million followers as of November 2025; he posts pictures that showcase his hobbies, which include reading, playing football, cooking, motorcycling and playing the guitar. He also enjoys playing chess in his spare time.

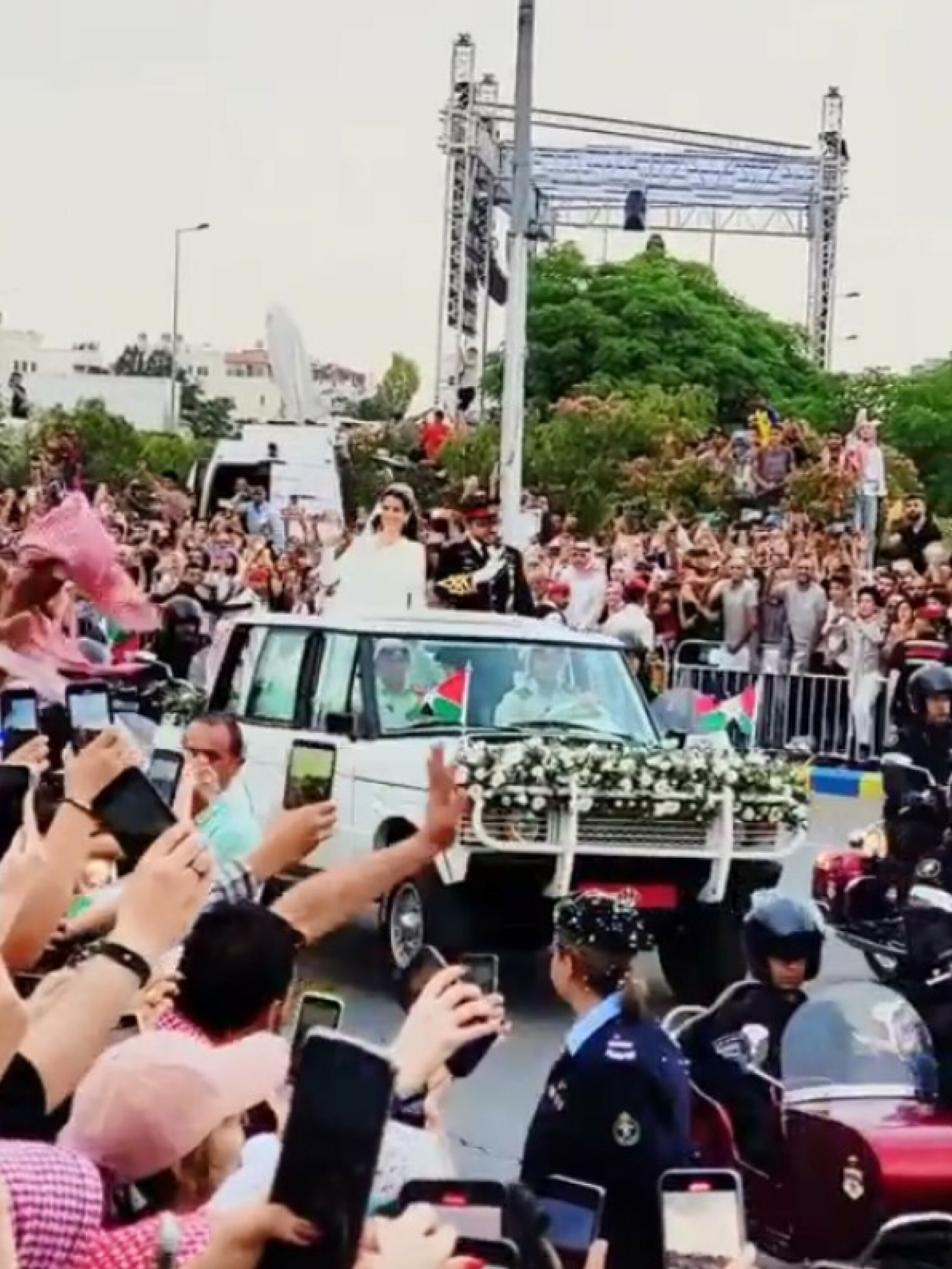
Crown Prince Hussein and Princess Rajwa ride through the streets of Amman following their wedding, 1 June 2023

On 17 August 2022, the Royal Hashemite Court announced the engagement of Crown Prince Hussein to Saudi citizen Rajwa Al Saif. The couple met via a mutual friend. The engagement ceremony was held at the home of Al Saif's father in Riyadh. Al Saif is the daughter of Khaled bin Musaed bin Saif bin Abdulaziz Al Saif and Azza bint Nayef bin Abdulaziz bin Ahmed Al Sudairi; through her mother, Al Saif is a maternal cousin of King Salman of Saudi Arabia and Saudi Crown Prince and Prime Minister Mohammed bin Salman. Al Saif attended the Syracuse University School of Architecture. The couple married on 1 June 2023 at Zahran Palace. On 3 August 2024, the couple had their first child, Princess Iman. She is the first grandchild of King Abdullah and Queen Rania.

== Honours ==
=== National honours ===
- Jordan:
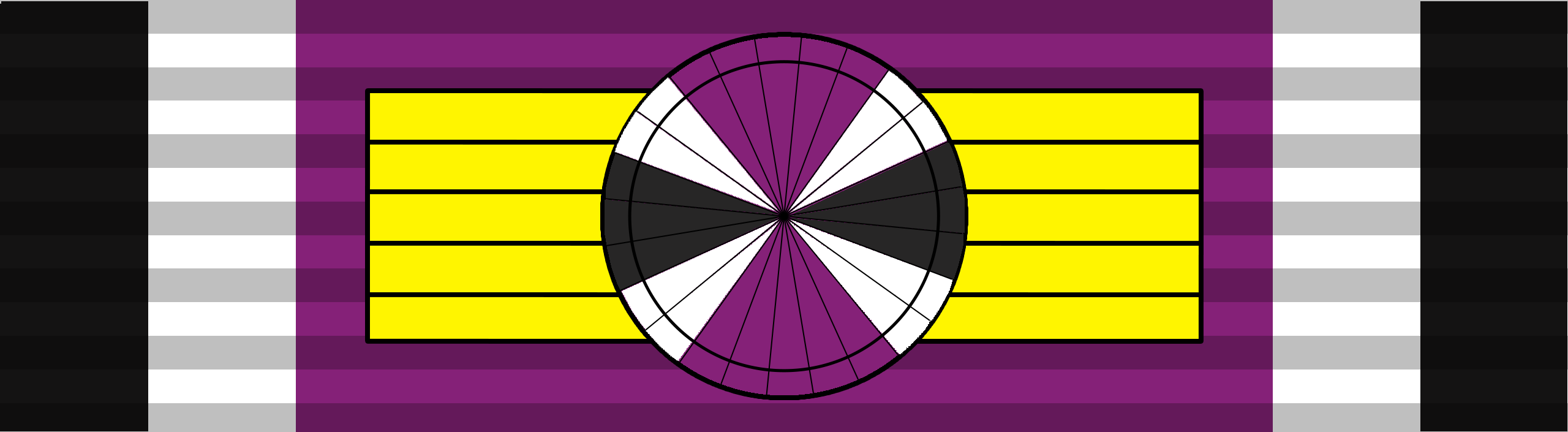
  - Grand Cordon of the Order of Independence.
  - Medal of the State Centennial.

=== Foreign honours ===
- Bahrain:
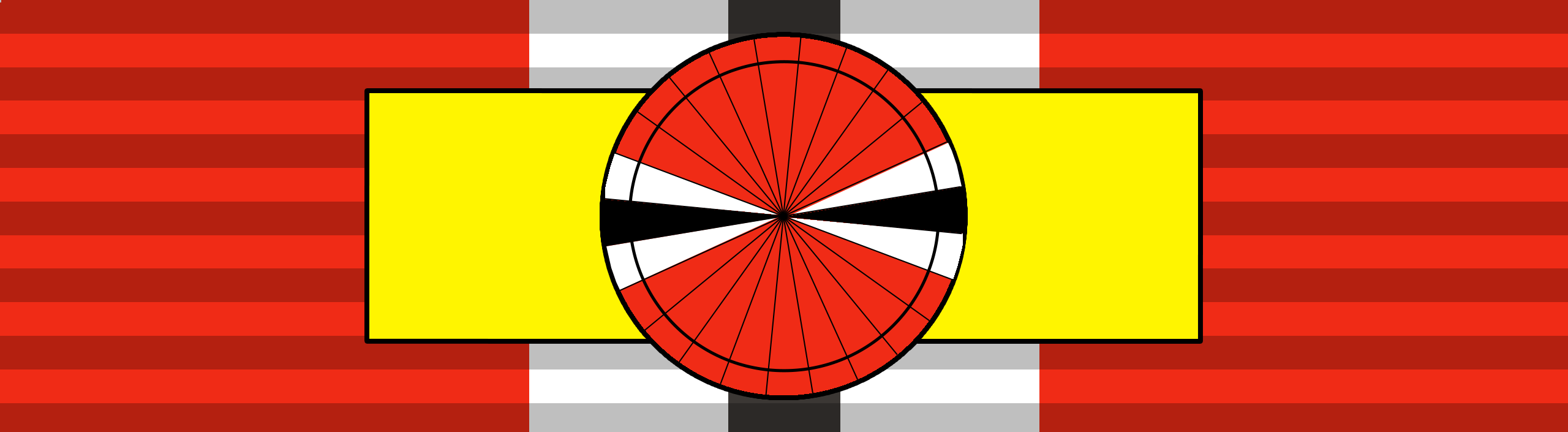
  - Member 1st class of the Order of the Renaissance (5 February 2019).
- Norway:
  - Grand Cross of the Order of Saint Olav (2 March 2020).
- Sweden:
  - Commander Grand Cross of the Royal Order of the Polar Star (15 November 2022).

== See also ==
- Hashemites
- Crown Prince of Jordan
- King Hussein
- List of current heirs apparent

== Notes ==
Hussein bin Abdullah House of Hashim Born: 28 June 1994
Royal titles
Preceded by Prince Hamzah	Crown Prince of Jordan; 2009–present	Incumbent
Lines of succession
First in line	Succession to the Jordanian throne	Succeeded by Prince Hashem
