= Abdullah II =

King of Jordan since 1999

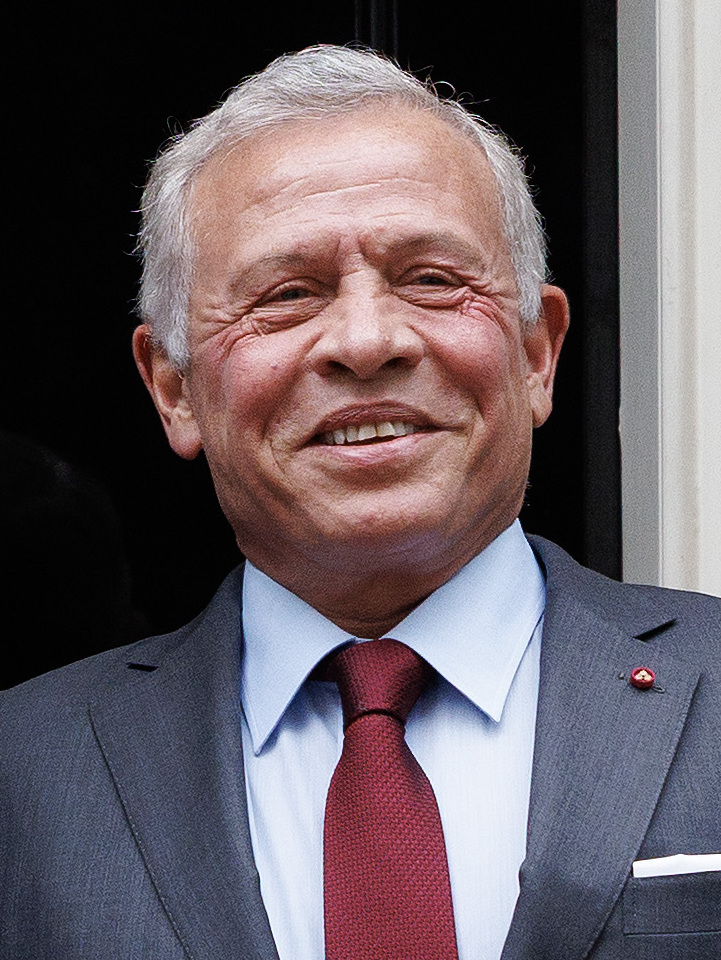
- Abdullah in 2025

King of Jordan
- Reign: 7 February 1999 – present
- Enthronement: 9 June 1999
- Predecessor: Hussein
- Heir apparent: Hussein
- Born: 30 January 1962 (age 64); Amman, Jordan
- Spouse: Rania Al-Yassin (m. 1993)
- Issue Detail: Crown Prince Hussein; Princess Iman; Princess Salma; Prince Hashem
Names
- Abdullah bin Hussein bin Talal bin Abdullah
- House: Hashemite
- Father: Hussein of Jordan
- Mother: Toni Gardiner
- Religion: Sunni Islam
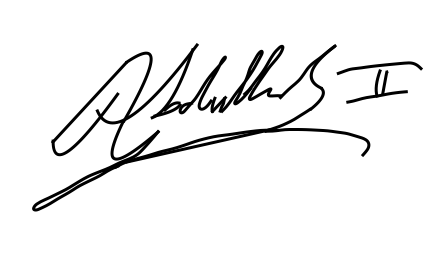
- Signature

Abdullah II (Note: Arabic: عبد الله الثاني, romanized: ʿAbd Allāh al-Thanī) (Abdullah bin Hussein; (Note: Arabic: عبد الله بن الحسين, romanized: ʿAbd Allāh ibn al-Ḥusayn) born 30 January 1962) is the king of Jordan, having acceded to the throne on 7 February 1999. He is a member of the Hashemites, who have been the reigning royal family of Jordan since 1921, and is traditionally regarded as a 41st-generation direct descendant of the Islamic prophet Muhammad.

Abdullah was born in Amman, as the first child of King Hussein and his wife, Princess Muna. As the king's eldest son, Abdullah was heir apparent until Hussein transferred the title to Abdullah's uncle Prince Hassan in 1965. Abdullah began his schooling in Amman, continuing his education abroad. He began his military career in 1980 as a training officer in the Jordanian Armed Forces, later assuming command of the country's Special Forces in 1994, eventually becoming a major general in 1998. In 1993, Abdullah married Rania Al-Yassin, with whom he has four children: Crown Prince Hussein, Princess Iman, Princess Salma and Prince Hashem. A few weeks before his death in 1999, King Hussein named Abdullah his heir, and Abdullah succeeded his father.

Abdullah, a constitutional monarch, heads an authoritarian regime with wide executive and legislative powers. He liberalized the economy when he assumed the throne. In 2011, large-scale protests demanding reform erupted in the Arab world, which led to civil wars in some countries. Abdullah responded quickly to domestic unrest by replacing the government and introducing reforms. Proportional representation was reintroduced to the Jordanian parliament for the 2016 election, a move which he said would eventually lead to establishing a parliamentary government, but government critics remain skeptical, viewing the reforms as cosmetic changes. Power remains centralized in the king's hands. The reforms took place amid unprecedented challenges stemming from regional instability, including an influx of 1.4 million Syrian refugees.

Abdullah is known for promoting interfaith dialogue and a moderate understanding of Islam. The longest-serving current Arab leader, he is custodian of the Muslim and Christian religious sites in Jerusalem, a position held by his dynasty since 1924. The 2021 Pandora Papers revealed Abdullah's hidden wealth through offshore entities.

== Early life ==
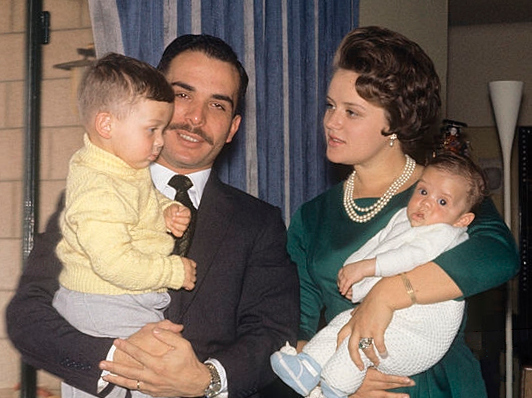
Prince Abdullah (age 2) and Prince Faisal with their parents, King Hussein and Princess Muna, in 1964

Abdullah was born on 30 January 1962 at Palestine Hospital in Al Abdali, Amman, to King Hussein and Hussein's British-born second wife, Princess Muna Al-Hussein (born Toni Avril Gardiner). He is the namesake of his paternal great-grandfather, Abdullah I, who founded modern Jordan. Abdullah's dynasty, the Hashemites, ruled Mecca for over 700 years—from the 10th century until the House of Saud conquered Mecca in 1925—and have ruled Jordan since 1921. The Hashemites are the oldest ruling dynasty in the Muslim world. According to family tradition, Abdullah is the 41st-generation agnatic descendant of Muhammad's daughter Fatimah and her husband, Ali, the fourth Rashidun caliph.

As Hussein's eldest son, Abdullah became heir apparent to the Jordanian throne under the 1952 constitution. Political instability caused King Hussein to appoint an adult heir in his place, choosing Abdullah's uncle Prince Hassan in 1965. Abdullah began his schooling in 1966 at the Islamic Educational College in Amman, and continued at St Edmund's School in England. He attended middle school at Eaglebrook School and high school at Deerfield Academy in the United States. He was the commencement speaker at Deerfield Academy's class of 2000 graduation.

Abdullah has four brothers and six sisters: Princess Alia, Prince Faisal, Princess Aisha, Princess Zein, Princess Haya, Prince Ali, Prince Hamzah, Prince Hashem, Princess Iman and Princess Raiyah; seven of them are paternal half-siblings.

== Military career ==
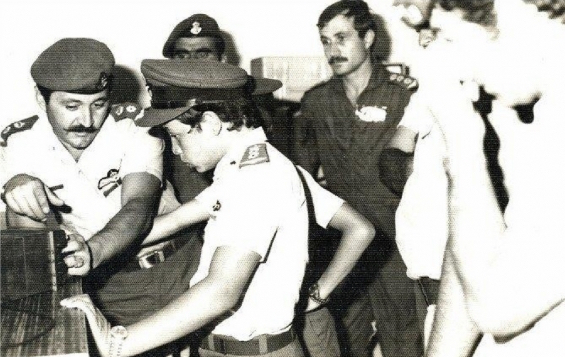
Abdullah, age 11, during a 1973 visit to the Royal Jordanian Air Force headquarters

He began his military career at the Royal Military Academy Sandhurst in England in 1980, while he was a training officer in the Jordanian Armed Forces. After Sandhurst, Abdullah was commissioned as a second lieutenant in the British Army and served a year in Britain and West Germany as a troop commander in the 13th/18th Royal Hussars (now the Light Dragoons).

Abdullah was admitted to Pembroke College, Oxford, in 1982, where he completed a one-year special-studies course in Middle Eastern affairs. He joined the Royal Jordanian Army on his return home, serving as first lieutenant and then as platoon commander and assistant commander of a company in the 40th Armored Brigade. Abdullah took a free-fall parachuting course in Jordan, and in 1985 he took the Armored Officer's Advanced Course at Fort Knox. He became commander of a tank company in the 91st Armored Brigade, with the rank of captain. Abdullah also served with the Royal Jordanian Air Force's anti-tank helicopter wing, receiving training to fly Cobra attack-helicopters.

The prince then attended the Edmund A. Walsh School of Foreign Service at Georgetown University in Washington, D.C., in 1987, undertaking advanced study and research in international affairs. He returned home to serve as assistant commander of the 17th Royal Tank Battalion in 1989, later being promoted to major. Abdullah attended a staff course at the British Staff College in 1990, and served the following year in the Office of the Inspector General of the Jordanian Armed Forces as the Armored Corps representative. He commanded a battalion in the 2nd Armored Cavalry Regiment in 1992 and was promoted to colonel the following year, commanding the 40th Brigade.

Abdullah met Rania Al-Yassin, a marketing employee at Apple Inc. in Amman, at a dinner organized by his sister Princess Aisha in January 1993. They became engaged two months later, and their marriage took place in June.

In 1994, Abdullah assumed command of Jordan's Special Forces and of other elite units as a brigadier general, restructuring them into the Joint Special Operations Command two years later. He became a major general, attended a course in defence-resources management at the American Naval Postgraduate School and commanded an elite special-forces manhunt in the pursuit of outlaws in 1998. The operation reportedly ended successfully, with his name chanted on the streets of Amman.

== Reign ==
=== Accession and enthronement ===
Abdullah joined his father on a number of missions, including meetings abroad with Soviet and American leaders. He was occasionally King Hussein's regent during the 1990s but this duty was mainly performed by Hussein's younger brother, Crown Prince Hassan. Abdullah led his father's delegation to Moscow for talks in 1987. He frequently visited the Pentagon in Washington, where he lobbied for increased military assistance to Jordan. The prince joined his father on trips to visit Hafez al-Assad in Damascus and Saddam Hussein in Baghdad (before the 1990 Gulf War). Abdullah commanded military exercises during Israeli military officials' visits to Jordan in 1997, and was sent to hand-deliver a message to Muammar Gaddafi in 1998.

King Hussein frequently traveled to the US for medical treatment after his diagnosis with cancer in 1992. After Hussein returned from a six-month medical absence from Jordan in late 1998, he criticized his brother Hassan's management of Jordanian affairs in a public letter, accusing him of abusing his constitutional powers as regent. On 24 January 1999, two weeks before his death, Hussein surprised everyone—including Abdullah who thought he would spend his life in the military—by replacing Hassan with his son as heir apparent.

The king died of complications of non-Hodgkin lymphoma on 7 February 1999. His 47-year reign extended through four turbulent decades of the Arab–Israeli conflict and the Cold War. Several hours after the announcement of his father's death, Abdullah appeared at an emergency session of the Jordanian parliament. Hussein's two brothers, Hassan and Mohammed, walked ahead of him as he entered the assembly. In Arabic, he swore the oath taken by his father almost fifty years earlier: "I swear by Almighty God to uphold the constitution and to be faithful to the nation". Speaker of the Senate Zaid Al-Rifai opened the session with Al-Fatiha (the opening chapter of the Quran), his voice cracking with emotion as he led the recitation. "God, save His Majesty... God, give him advice and take care of him." Abdullah's investiture took place on 9 June 1999. A reception at Raghadan Palace attended by 800 dignitaries followed a motorcade ride through Amman by the 37-year-old king and his 29-year-old wife, Rania—the then youngest queen in the world.

=== First year ===
As king, Abdullah retains wider executive and legislative authority than is normally the case for a constitutional monarch. He is one of the few monarchs in the world who both rules and reigns. He is head of state and commander-in-chief of the Jordanian Armed Forces and appoints the prime minister and the directors of security agencies. The prime minister is free to choose his cabinet. The Parliament of Jordan consists of two chambers: the appointed Senate and the elected House of Representatives, which serve as a check on the government. However, according to Freedom House, most seats in the House are held by pro-palace independents, and the crown's authority is such that it is extremely difficult for a party to win power solely via the ballot box. The Senate is appointed by the king, and the House of Representatives is directly elected.

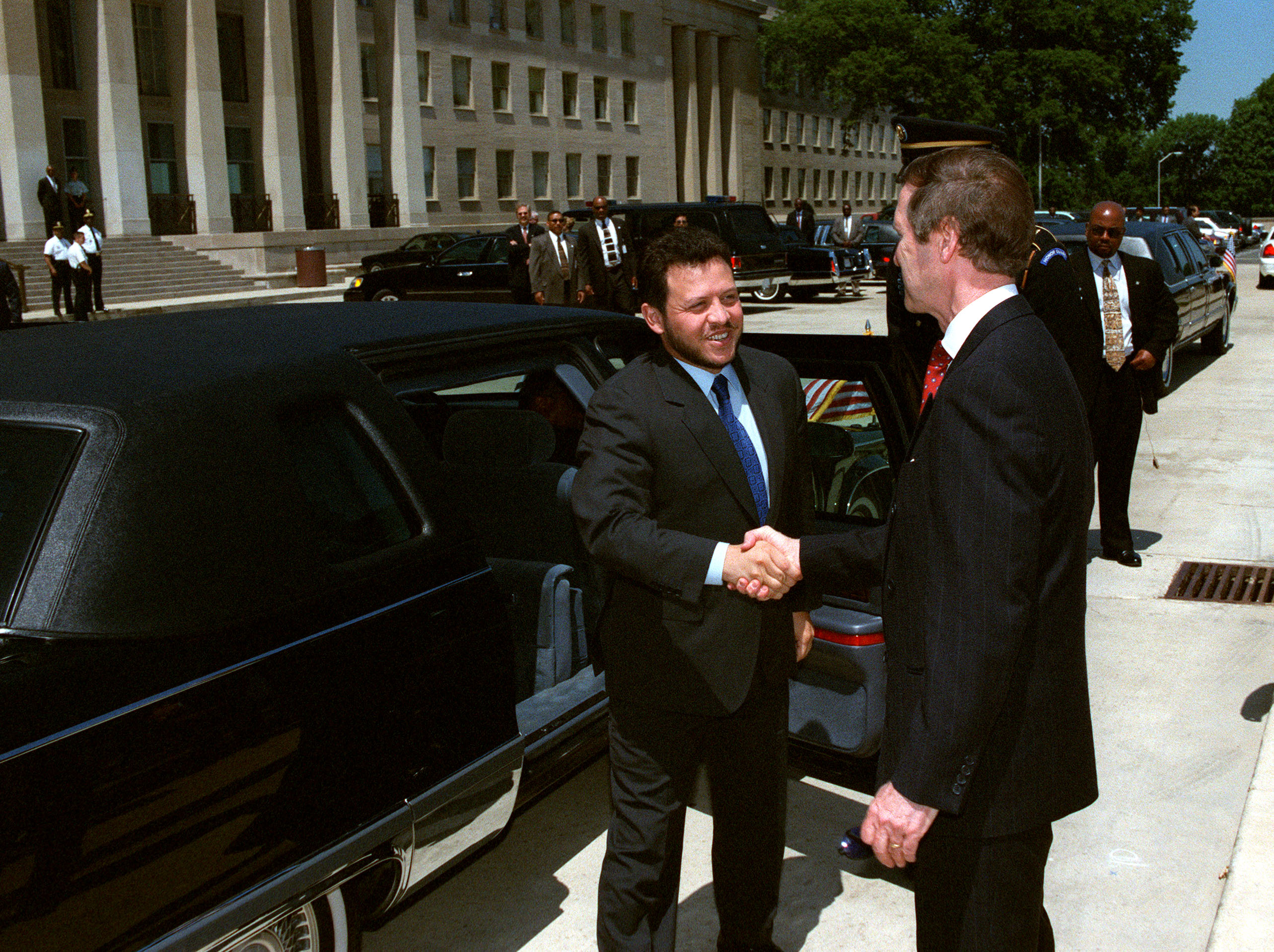
Abdullah welcomed by US Secretary of Defense William Cohen during his first visit to the United States as king in 1999

When Abdullah ascended to the throne as Jordan's fourth king, observers doubted his ability to manage the country's economic crisis—a legacy of the 1990 Gulf War. The king maintained his father's moderate pro-Western policy, supporting the 1994 Israel–Jordan peace treaty, and the royal transition prompted the United States and Arab states of the Persian Gulf to increase their aid. In the early years of Abdullah's reign, which then ruled over a population of 4.5 million, it was reported that he frequently went undercover to see Jordan's challenges firsthand. In 2000 he said about his incognito visits to government institutions, "The bureaucrats are terrified. It's great."

Abdullah cracked down on the Hamas presence in Jordan in November 1999 after pleas from the United States, Israel and the Palestinian Authority. The crackdown occurred during peace talks between Israel and the Palestinian Authority. The king exiled four Hamas officials to Qatar and barred the group from political activity, closing their offices in Amman. The peace talks collapsed into a violent Palestinian uprising, the Second Intifada, in September 2000. As a result, Jordan faced dwindling tourism; tourism is an economic cornerstone of Jordan, a country with few natural resources. Abdullah reportedly spearheaded efforts to defuse the political violence.

=== 2000s ===
On 23 June 2000, while vacationing in the Greek Islands, Abdullah received a phone call from the director of Mukhabarat (the country's Intelligence Directorate) warning of an assassination attempt against him by Al-Qaeda. The plot was to target Abdullah and his family's rented yacht with explosives. The September 11 attacks in 2001 on American targets were fiercely condemned by Abdullah. Jordan responded quickly to American requests for assistance, enacting counterterrorism legislation and maintaining a high level of vigilance. The country's Mukhabarat foiled similar plots the following year against Western targets, including the American and British embassies in Lebanon.

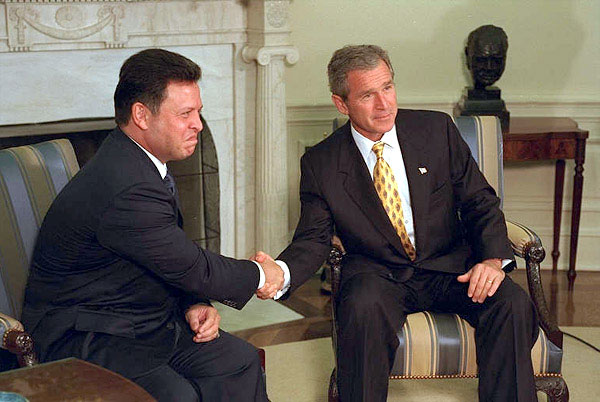
Abdullah meets with U.S. President George W. Bush in the Oval Office, 28 September 2001

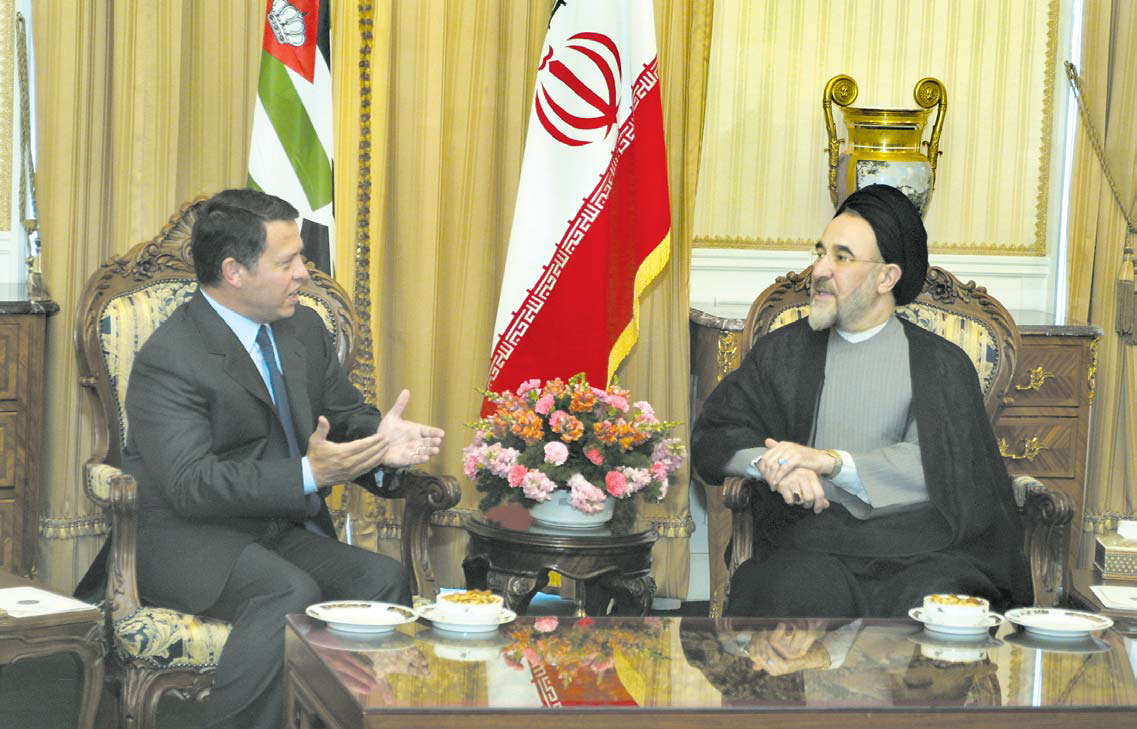
Abdullah and Iranian President Mohammad Khatami in Tehran, 2 September 2003

With the George W. Bush administration planning an attack on Iraq, accusing Saddam Hussein of possessing weapons of mass destruction, Abdullah opposed American intervention. "A strike on Iraq will be disastrous for Iraq and the region as a whole and will threaten the security and stability of the Middle East", he warned during American vice president Dick Cheney's 2002 visit to the Middle East. In March 2003, during a meeting with George W. Bush at the White House, Abdullah tried to dissuade the president from invading Iraq. During the 1990 Gulf War, King Hussein's wariness of war was seen as siding with Saddam Hussein, which alienated Jordan from its Arab allies in the Persian Gulf region and the Western world; his stance precipitated an economic crisis triggered by the suspension of foreign aid and investment to Jordan. Failing to persuade Bush, Abdullah broke with domestic opposition. He allowed American Patriot batteries to be stationed in the Jordanian desert along its border with Iraq, but did not allow coalition troops to launch an invasion from Jordan. Jordan had received subsidized oil from Saddam Hussein's Iraq at a savings of about $500 million per year, equal to American aid to Jordan at the time.

The 2003 Jordanian general election was the first parliamentary election under Abdullah's rule. Although the election was supposed to be held in 2001, it was postponed by the king due to regional political instability in accordance with the Jordanian constitution (which authorizes the monarch to postpone an election for a maximum of two years). His postponement was criticized by the largest Islamist opposition party in the country, the Islamic Action Front (the political arm of the Muslim Brotherhood), who accused Abdullah of impeding the democratic process. He inherited a controversial single non-transferable vote electoral system, implemented by his father in 1991, which hobbled Islamic political parties after they obtained 22 of 80 seats in the 1989 elections. Abdullah issued a royal decree before the election, introducing an amendment to the election law giving women a six-seat quota in Parliament.

In 2004, Abdullah coined the term "Shia Crescent" to describe a Shia-dominated region from Damascus to Tehran (bypassing Baghdad) which promoted sectarian politics. His warning received international attention, leading Abdullah to clarify that he meant a shift in political (not sectarian) alignment. The king's observation was validated after the rise of Shia Nouri Al-Maliki to the Iraqi government in 2006 and subsequent events.

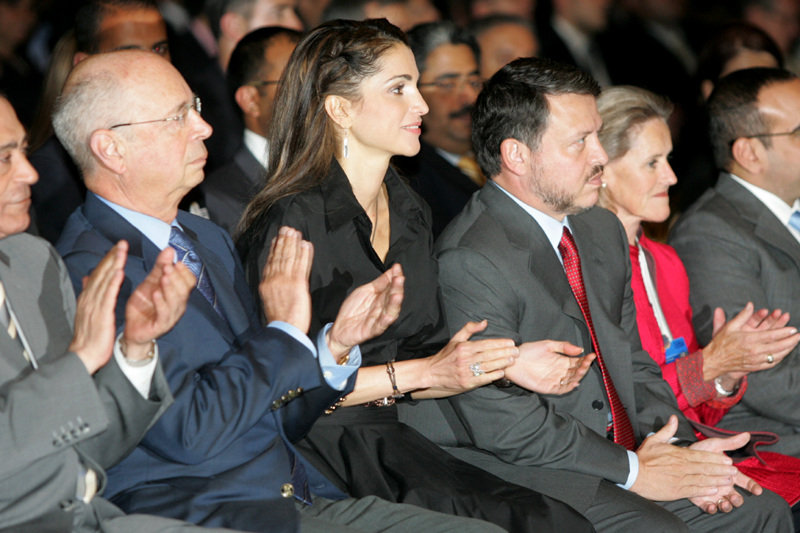
Abdullah and Queen Rania (third and fourth from left) during the World Economic Forum in Jordan, 20 May 2007

Al-Qaeda in Iraq founder Abu Musab al-Zarqawi claimed responsibility for a terrorist attack in Amman on 9 November 2005. It was the deadliest attack in Jordan's history; suicide bombers targeted three hotels, one of which was hosting a wedding. The attack killed 60 people and injured 115. Prior to the attack, Al-Zarqawi had threatened: "What is coming is more vicious and bitter". In 2006, Al-Zarqawi was killed in an airstrike with the aid of Jordanian intelligence agents. Abdullah and Jordan are viewed with contempt by Islamic extremists for the country's peace treaty with Israel and its relationship with the West. Jordan's security was tightened, and no major terrorist attacks have been reported in the country since then.

Russian president Vladimir Putin visited Jordan for the first time in February 2007 and was welcomed by Abdullah. The leaders discussed prospects for the Israeli–Palestinian peace process, Iran's nuclear program and violence in Iraq.

Abdullah established King's Academy near Madaba, the Middle East's first boarding school, in 2007 in appreciation of the education he received at Deerfield Academy. He hired Deerfield headmaster Eric Widmer to oversee the school, which has students from throughout the region.

In 2007, it was reported that Jordan hosted 800,000 Iraqi refugees who fled the insurgency following the American invasion; most have returned to Iraq. The 2007 Jordanian general election was held in November, with secular opposition groups accusing the government of using rising Islamism as an excuse for "autocratic rule". In 2008, Abdullah became the first Arab head of state to visit Iraq after the 2003 American invasion. The visit was amid Sunni Arab concerns of growing Iranian influence in Iraq.

=== 2010s ===
==== Arab Spring 2010–2014 ====
The Tunisian Revolution in December 2010 (which unseated that country's president) brought Egyptians into the streets, and by January 2011 they overthrew president Hosni Mubarak. Protests in other Arab countries soon followed, resulting in civil wars in Libya, Syria and Yemen. In Jordan, opposition groups including the Muslim Brotherhood, leftists, and retired army generals protested throughout the country. By 1 February 2011, domestic unrest prompted Abdullah to sack Samir Rifai's government and pledge to follow a democratic trajectory.

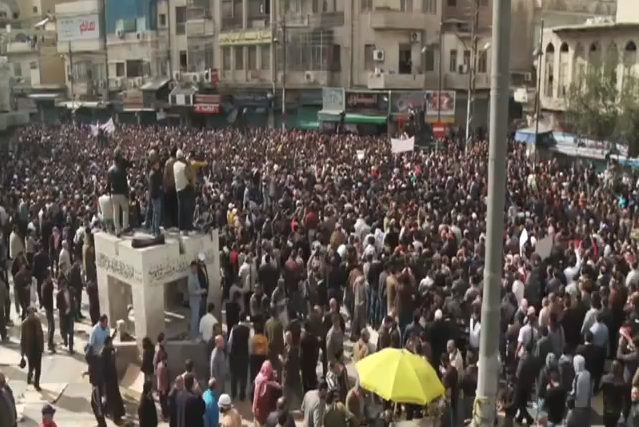
16 November 2012 Arab Spring demonstration in Amman against a later-revoked government decision to cut fuel subsidies

The 2011–12 Jordanian protests were driven by complaints about a troubled economy: soaring prices, widespread unemployment and a relatively low standard of living. Although some called for an end to the monarchy, most protesters' anger was directed at politicians viewed as undemocratic, corrupt and unaccountable. Demonstrators called for the dissolution of the parliament which had been elected three months earlier in November 2010, when pro-regime figures won a majority of seats. The Jordanian monarchy was the first Arab regime to offer political concessions during the Arab Spring. Marouf Bakhit was appointed prime minister, but protests continued throughout the summer; Bakhit was seen as a conservative unlikely to push for reform. Dissatisfied with the pace of reform, Abdullah sacked Bakhit's government and appointed Awn Khasawneh to form a cabinet. Khasawneh abruptly resigned in April 2012, and the king appointed Fayez Tarawneh as interim prime minister; it was the third government reshuffle in 18 months.

In November 2012, the government cut fuel subsidies, driving up prices. The decision, later revoked, triggered large-scale protests across the country. The regime calmed the unrest by introducing reforms, amending about one-third of the constitution and establishing a Constitutional Court and the Independent Election Commission. Abdullah called for an early parliamentary election and appointed Abdullah Ensour to form a cabinet of intermittent government. In the January 2013 election, pro-regime figures were victorious as opposition groups continued a boycott, with Islamic Action Front claiming earlier that election was performed in absence of actual opposition. Since December 2012, the king has published seven discussion papers outlining his vision of democracy and reform in Jordan.

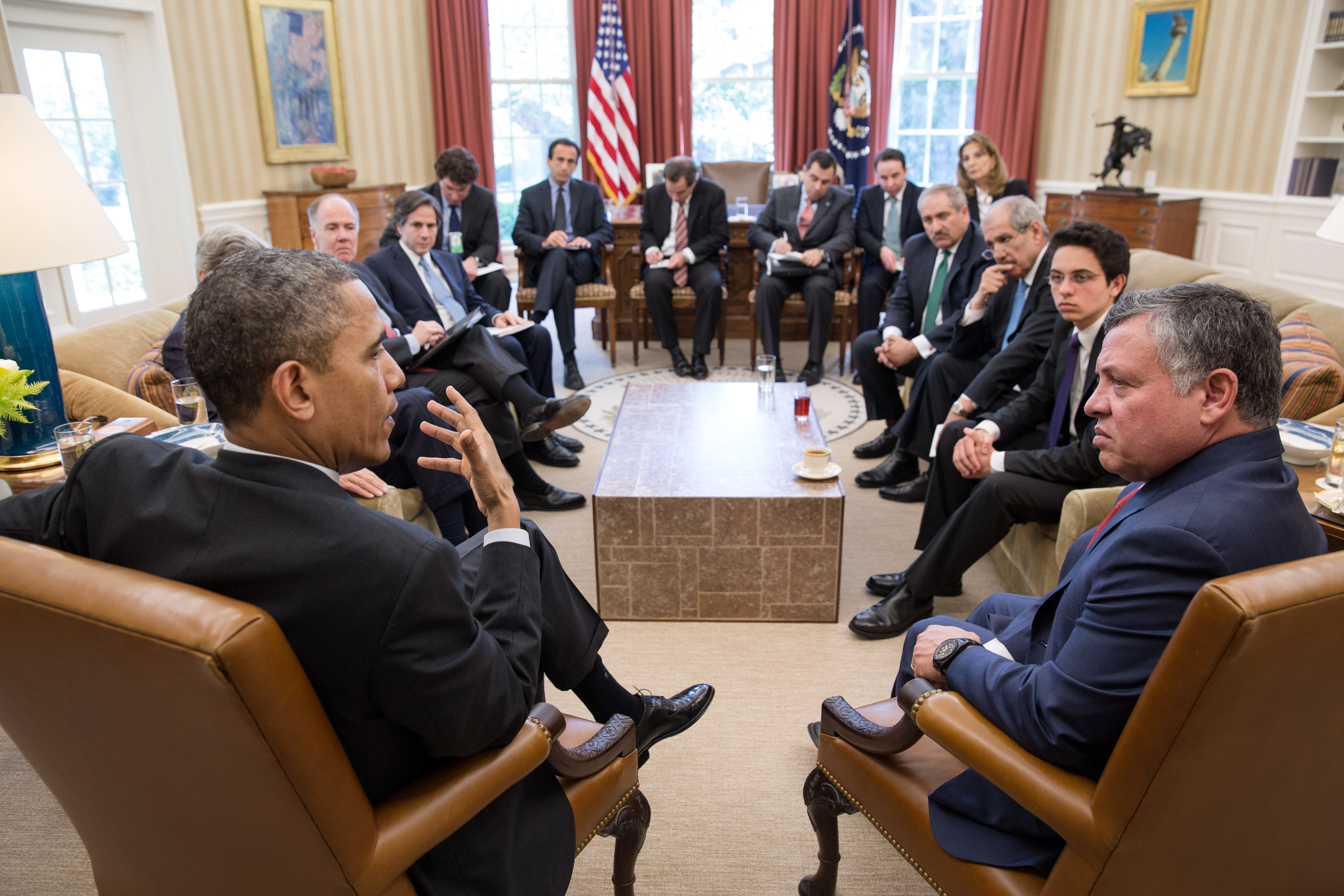
Abdullah and U.S. President Barack Obama in the Oval Office in Washington, D.C., 26 April 2013

==== West Bank ====
In December 2012, Abdullah was the first head of state to visit the West Bank after a United Nations General Assembly vote upgraded the Palestinian Authority to a nonmember observer state. Jordan sees an independent Palestinian state, with the 1967 borders, as part of the two-state solution and of supreme national interest. Jordan, the only country bordering the West Bank other than Israel, ruled it after the 1948 Arab–Israeli War and lost in the 1967 Six-Day War. Its annexation of the West Bank was not recognized, and in 1988 the kingdom ceded its claim to the territory.

An interview with Abdullah by Jeffrey Goldberg, published in The Atlantic in March 2013, sparked controversy when the king criticized local and international figures and parties. He called the Muslim Brotherhood a "Masonic cult" and "wolves in sheep's clothing", described ousted Egyptian president Mohammad Morsi as a man with "no depth" and said that Turkish prime minister Recep Tayyip Erdogan saw democracy as "a bus ride". Abdullah also criticized American diplomats, some of his country's tribal leaders and members of his family.

Another 2013 article in The Atlantic advised him to address governmental corruption, saying that there "is a growing perception that the degeneracy reaches the palace". According to the article, Abdullah was accused of "illegally appropriating 'tribal' lands" shortly after his accession and members of 36 Jordanian tribes issued a statement denouncing Queen Rania's "publicized and extravagant" 43rd birthday party in 2013.

==== Regional turmoil 2014–2019 ====
I was asked many questions by Jordanians that were getting just as frustrated seeing that 20 per cent of their country are now Syrian refugees, the impact it has on jobs, on property, on unemployment. And they ask me, "stop the Syrians coming into the country", and I say "How?" When you have a mother, a pregnant mother with a child in the hand trying to cross the border, how are we going to stop her? Do we sort of point bayonets at these people that are running away from horrible and threatening lives? There is a level of humanity that we have to reach out to each other.

— Abdullah's 23 November 2016 interview with the Australian Broadcasting Corporation

The March 2011 outbreak of the Syrian Civil War forced masses of refugees across Jordan's border with Syria, about 3,000 refugees per day in the war's early stages. When asked about the Syrian conflict in an interview with the BBC in November 2011, Abdullah said that he would resign if he was in Bashar al-Assad's shoes. "Whenever you exert violence on your own people, it's never going to end well and so as far as I'm concerned, yes, there will be an expiration date, but again it is almost impossible for anybody to predict whether that is six weeks, six months or six years."

About the unrest in Iraq, Abdullah told a delegation of US congressmen in June 2014 about his fear that the turmoil would spill across the entire region. He said that any solution to the problems in the war-torn countries must involve all the people of Iraq and Syria. Jordan began erecting barriers along its arid 175-kilometre (109 mi) border with Iraq and 379-kilometre (235 mi) border with Syria. Since then, hundreds of infiltration attempts have been foiled by Jordanian border guards who were also occupied with the flow of refugees. Jordan was involved in the CIA-led Timber Sycamore covert operation to train and arm Syrian rebels.

In April 2014, the Islamic State in Iraq and the Levant (ISIL), an al-Qaeda affiliate which emerged in early 2014 when it drove Iraqi government forces out of key cities, posted an online video which threatened to invade the kingdom and slaughter Abdullah (whom they saw as an enemy of Islam). "I have a message to the tyrant of Jordan: we are coming to you with death and explosive belts", an ISIL fighter said as he destroyed a Jordanian passport. In August 2014, thousands of Iraqi Christians fled ISIL and sought shelter in Jordanian churches.

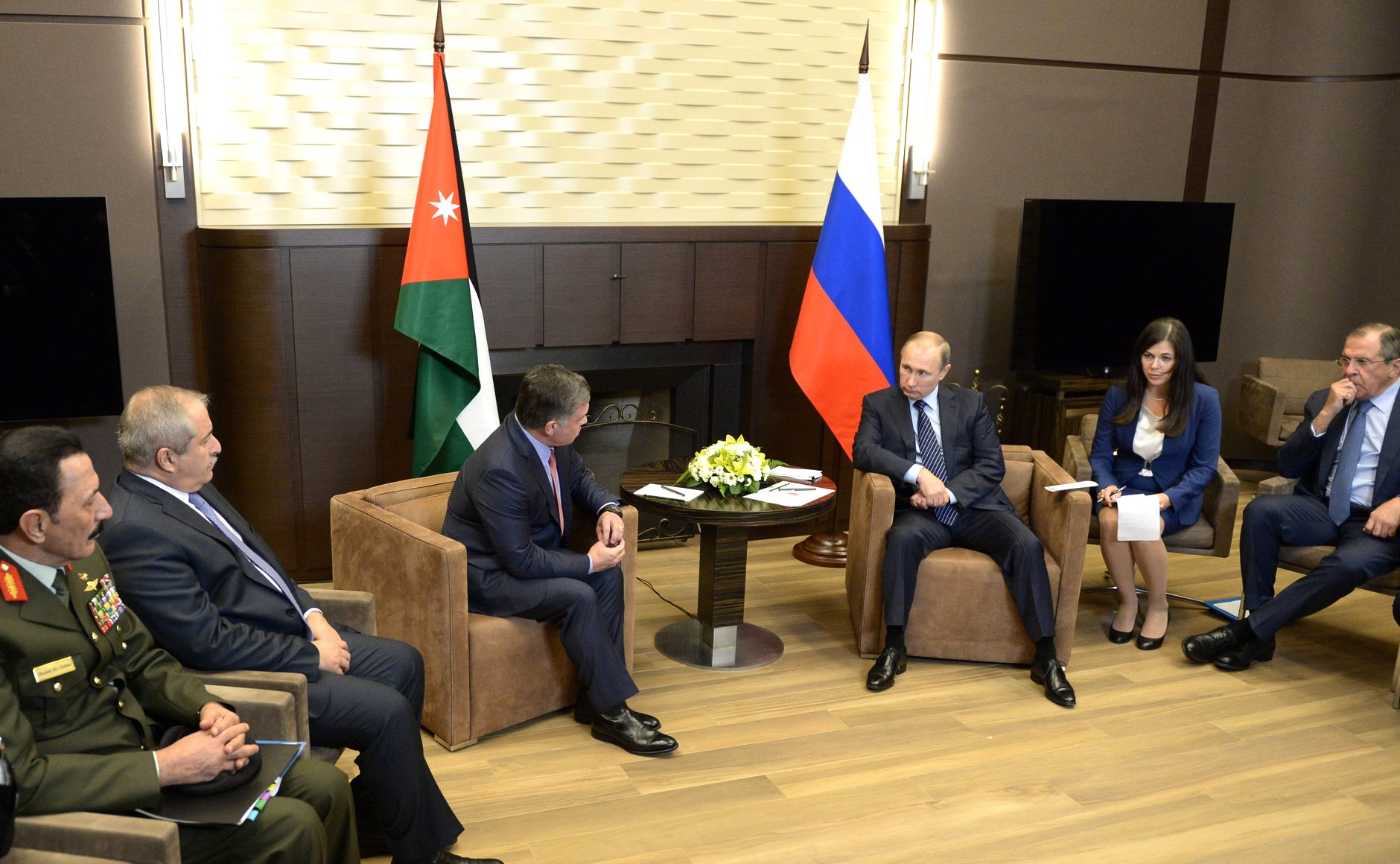
Abdullah meets with Russian President Vladimir Putin and Russian Foreign Minister Sergey Lavrov in Sochi, 24 November 2015

Shortly after Jordan joined the international coalition against ISIL in mid-September 2014, the country's security apparatus foiled a terror plot targeting civilians in Jordan. Shortly afterwards, Abdullah said in an interview that the country's borders with Iraq and Syria were "extremely safe". In late December 2014, a Jordanian F-16 fighter jet crashed near Raqqa, Syria, during a mission. A video was posted online on 3 February 2015, showing captured Jordanian pilot Muath Al-Kasasbeh being burned to death in a cage; throughout January, Jordan had negotiated for Al-Kasasbeh's release. The terrorist group reportedly demanded the release of Sajida al-Rishawi in return, a suicide bomber whose belt failed to detonate in the 2005 Amman bombings. Al-Kasasbeh's killing spurred outrage in the country, while the king was away in a state visit to the United States. Before returning to Jordan, Abdullah swiftly ratified death sentences previously handed down to two imprisoned Iraqi jihadists, Sajida al-Rishawi and Ziad Al-Karbouly, who were executed before dawn of the next day. The same evening, Abdullah was welcomed in Amman by cheering crowds who lined along the airport road to express their support. His decision also garnered international support. As commander-in-chief, Abdullah launched Operation Martyr Muath, a series of airstrikes against ISIL targets during the following week targeting weapons caches, training camps and oil-extraction facilities. His retaliation was praised on the Internet, where he was dubbed "The Warrior King". Rumors had circulated that he personally led the sorties, although the government officially denied this.

During a January 2016 BBC interview, Abdullah said that Jordan is at the "boiling point" because of the Syrian refugee influx, Jordan claims more than a million Syrians have sought refuge in Jordan. The king noted pressure on the country's economy, infrastructure and services. "Sooner or later, I think, the dam is going to burst", he warned. Jordan has historically welcomed refugees—Palestinians in 1948 and 1967, Iraqis during the American invasion and now Syrians, who make up about 20 percent of Jordan's then 9.5 million population—and, according to Abdullah, "For the first time, we can't do it any more."

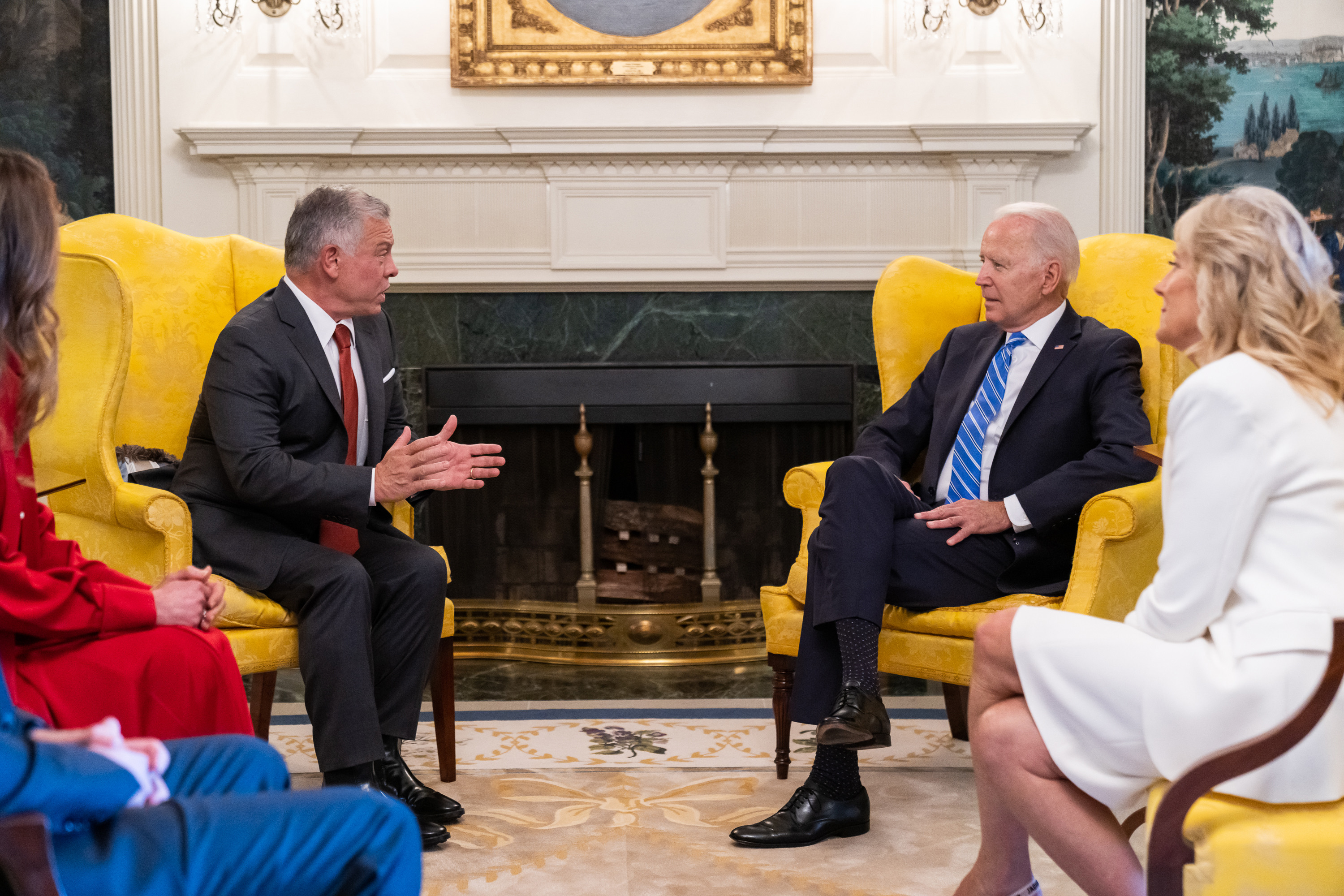
Abdullah meets with U.S. President Joe Biden in the Diplomatic Reception Room, 19 July 2021

The November 2016 Jordanian general election was the first election since 1989 primarily using a form of proportional representation; intervening elections had used the single non-transferable vote system. Reforms encouraged opposition parties, including the Islamic Action Front (who had boycotted previous elections, including 2010 and 2013), to participate. The election was considered fair and transparent by independent international observers. Proportional representation is seen as the first step toward establishing parliamentary governments in which parliamentary blocs, instead of the king, choose the prime minister. However, the underdevelopment of political parties in Jordan has slowed down such moves.

Abdullah established a close cooperation between Jordan and the International Labour Organization (ILO). Between 2013 and 2015, the ILO started programs in Jordan to support working opportunities for refugees in Jordan. In 2016, Jordan signed the Jordan Compact, which improved legal employments opportunities for refugees.

After Donald Trump's inauguration as United States president on 20 January 2017, Abdullah traveled to the US on an official visit. He was worried about the new administration's positions on the Israeli–Palestinian conflict, specifically, issues relating to Israeli settlements. Abdullah met Trump briefly at the National Prayer Breakfast on 2 February, and reportedly convinced him to change his policy towards Israeli settlements. This was substantiated by White House press secretary Sean Spicer, who said two days later that the expansion of Israeli settlements may not be helpful in achieving peace. According to The New York Times, the "encounter put the king, one of the most respected leaders of the Arab world, ahead of Mr. Netanyahu in seeing the new president." Senator Bob Corker confirmed Abdullah's influence in an interview: "We call him the Henry Kissinger of that part of the world and we do always love to listen to his view of the region." Abdullah criticized United States' decision to recognize Jerusalem as the capital of Israel.

On 4 June 2018, Prime Minister Hani Al-Mulki resigned from office. Large protests against corruption, the economic policies and austerity plans as well as the tax increases, occurred before Hani Al-Mulki resigned. Abdullah moved former education minister Omar Razzaz to the position of the new Prime Minister and ordered him to conduct a review of the controversial tax system.

On 25 June 2018, Abdullah made another official visit to Washington, DC. He was hosted by President Trump at the White House and they discussed "terrorism, the threat from Iran and the crisis in Syria, and working towards a lasting peace between Israelis and Palestinians". In August 2018, after the Trump administration had announced to end all US funding for UNRWA, Abdullah sought to replace the US funds. Jordan convened meetings of the Arab League and Western countries.

=== 2020s ===
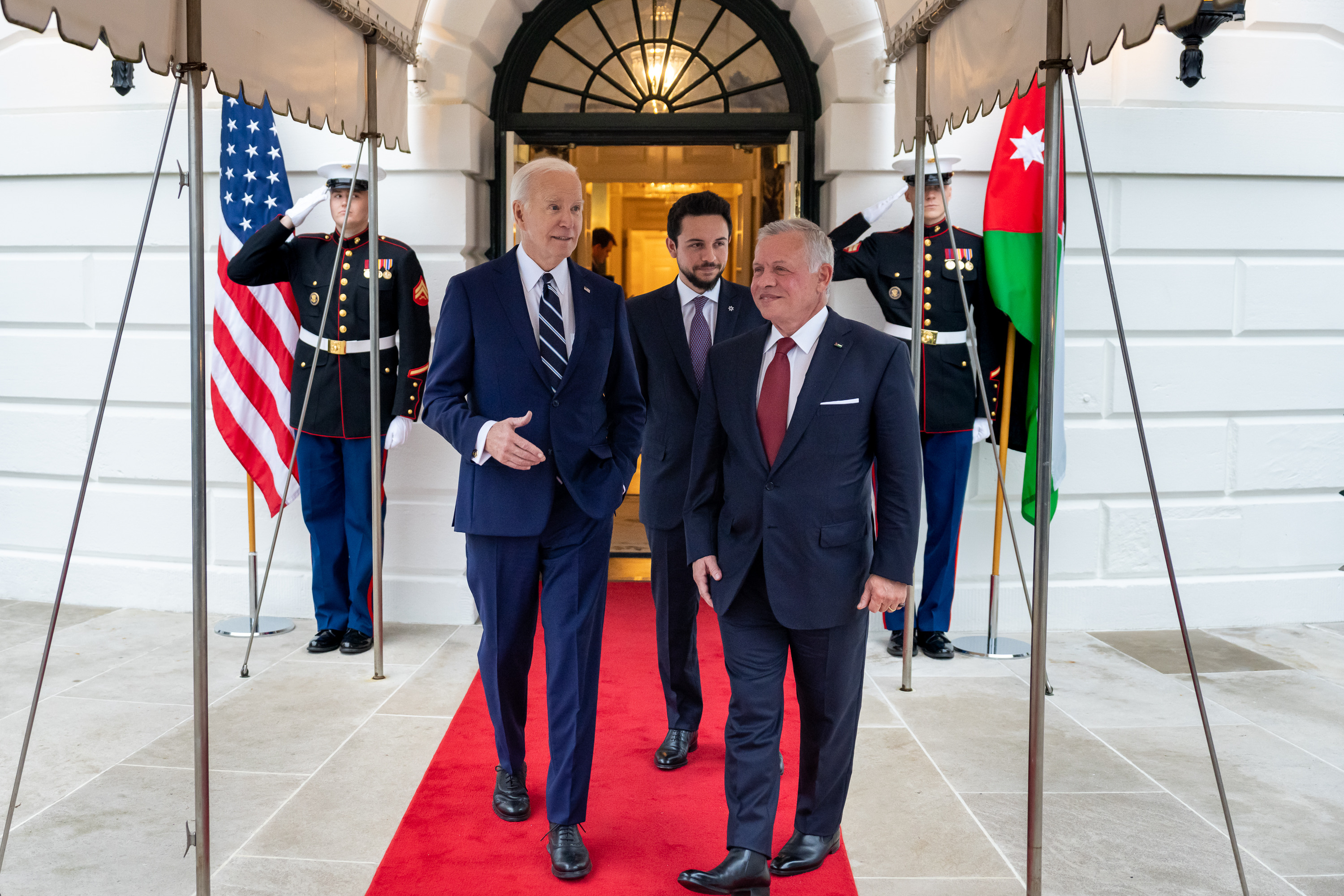
Abdullah and Crown Prince Hussein with US President Joe Biden in February 2024

In an interview with Der Spiegel in May 2020, Abdullah criticized Donald Trump's plans for peace in the Middle East including Israel annexing parts of the West Bank. He stated, "The two-state solution is the only way for us to be able to move forward", and noted a possible Israeli annexation of the West Bank causes conflicts. In October 2020, Omar Razzaz resigned from his position due to the criticism of his handling of the COVID-19 pandemic. In addition, Abdullah dissolved the parliament and instructed his chief policy adviser, Bishr Al-Khasawneh, to form a new government as the new Prime Minister. After Joe Biden won the 2020 United States presidential election, Abdullah was the first Arab leader to congratulate Biden for his victory.

In April 2021, Abdullah ordered the arrest of his half-brother, Prince Hamzah bin Hussein, and twenty other courtiers for what was called "sedition". Hamzah's removal as crown prince by Abdullah has been cited as a possible factor. 18 other Jordanian figures were also arrested, including Abdullah's controversial former chief of staff, former Saudi Arabian envoy and Royal Court Chief Bassem Awadallah. Royal family member Sharif Hassan Bin Zaid, who is hardly known in Jordan and whose father now resides in Saudi Arabia, was also among those arrested. On 7 April, King Abdullah II spoke publicly for the first time since the alleged coup and hinted that the Jordanian royal feud was over, stating that the "sedition" that caused him "pain and anger" was now buried and that Hamzah was now "in his palace under my protection." Abdullah also stated that the crisis began when Jordan's military chief of staff paid a visit to Hamzah and warned him to stop attending meetings with critics of the government.

On 19 July 2021, during a two-week visit to the US, Abdullah was received at the White House by President Joe Biden. They discussed the Middle East conflict, the battle against COVID-19, and the relationship between Jordan and the US. Abdullah was the first leader from the Middle East to visit the White House since Biden's inauguration on 20 January 2021.

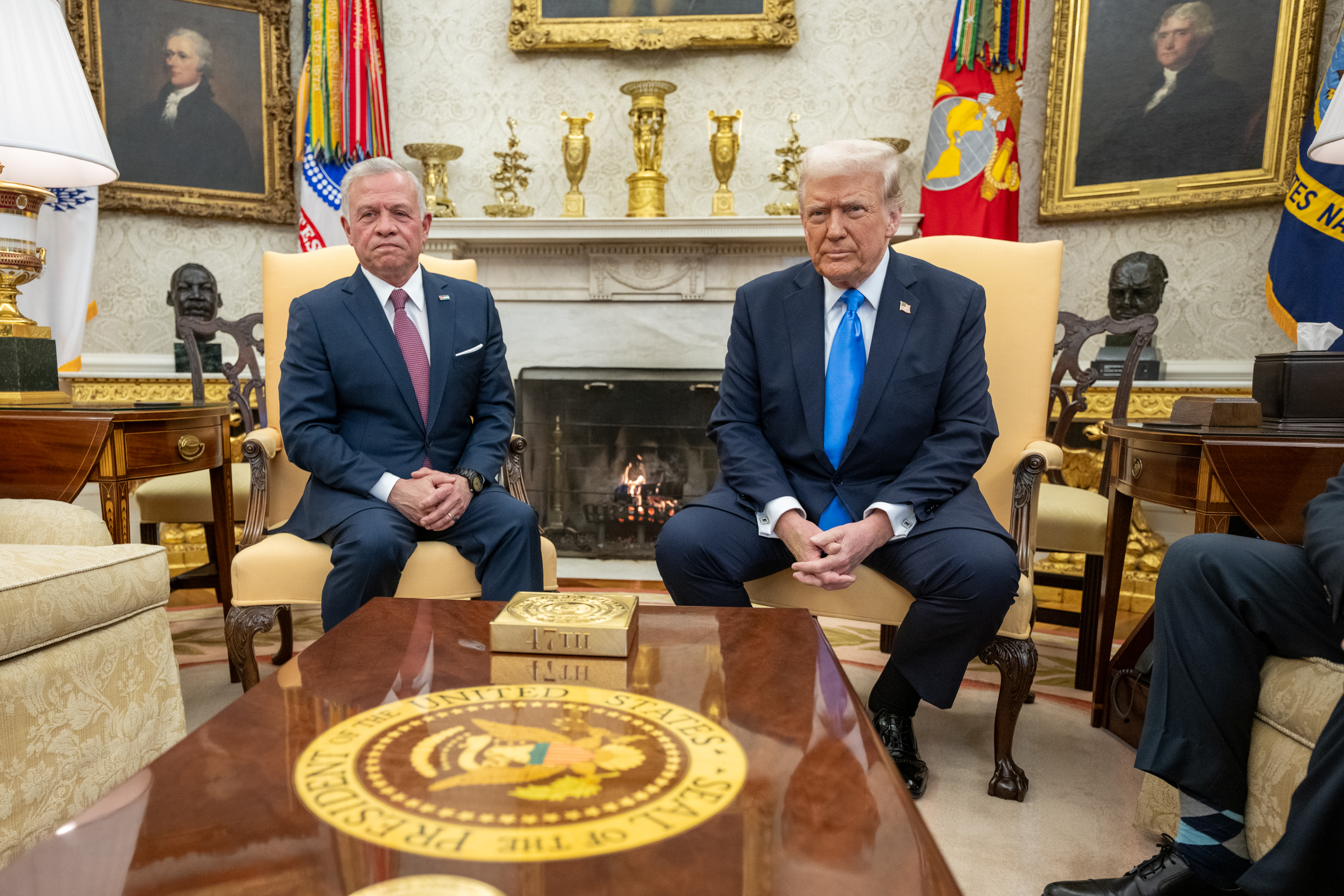
Abdullah meets with U.S. President Donald Trump in Washington, D.C., 11 February 2025

On 3 October 2021, Abdullah held a telephone conversation with Syrian president Bashar al-Assad, the first contact since the start of the Syrian civil war. They discussed bilateral relations after Amman fully opened borders with Syria.

In October 2023, Abdullah condemned Israel's blockade of the Gaza Strip and the "collective punishment" of Palestinians in Gaza during the Gaza war. In February 2024, Abdullah called for an immediate ceasefire in the war, and called upon the US to restore funding to UNRWA. He also warned against the proposed Rafah offensive, arguing it would "produce another humanitarian catastrophe". In conjunction with several other nations, Abdullah and the Jordanian government arranged for aid packages to delivered to Gaza via airdrop. A video filmed by Jordanian TV station Al-Mamlaka depicted Abdullah personally taking part in one of these airdrops, which delivered food aid and medical supplies to affected areas.

King Abdullah rejected President Donald Trump's proposal for Jordan to absorb Palestinians living in Gaza. On 26 February 2025, he met with Syrian president Ahmed al-Sharaa in Amman. Abdullah condemned Israeli attacks on Syria.

== Administrative reforms ==
=== Economic ===
King Abdullah proposed significant economic reforms to the country during the first decade of his reign. Jordan, a relatively-small, semi-arid, almost-landlocked country, has one of the smallest economies in the region; its GDP was about $39 billion in 2016. Insufficient natural resources, especially in water and oil (unlike its neighbors) have given the kingdom chronic government debt, unemployment and poverty which led to a dependence on foreign aid from its Western and Arab allies in the Persian Gulf region. Jordan embarked on an aggressive economic liberalization program when Abdullah was crowned. Abdullah set up five other special economic zones: Irbid, Ajloun, Mafraq, Ma'an and the Dead Sea.

Abdullah negotiated a free-trade agreement with the United States, the third free-trade agreement for the US and its first with an Arab country. Under the agreement, Jordanian exports to the United States increased from $63 million in 2000 to over $1.4 billion in 2015. Jordan's foreign debt-to-GDP ratio fell from more than 210 percent in 1990 to 83 percent by the end of 2005, a decrease called an "extraordinary achievement" by the International Monetary Fund. Abdullah's efforts have made Jordan the freest Arab economy and the ninth-freest economy in the world, according to a 2014 study by the Friedrich Naumann Foundation for Liberty.

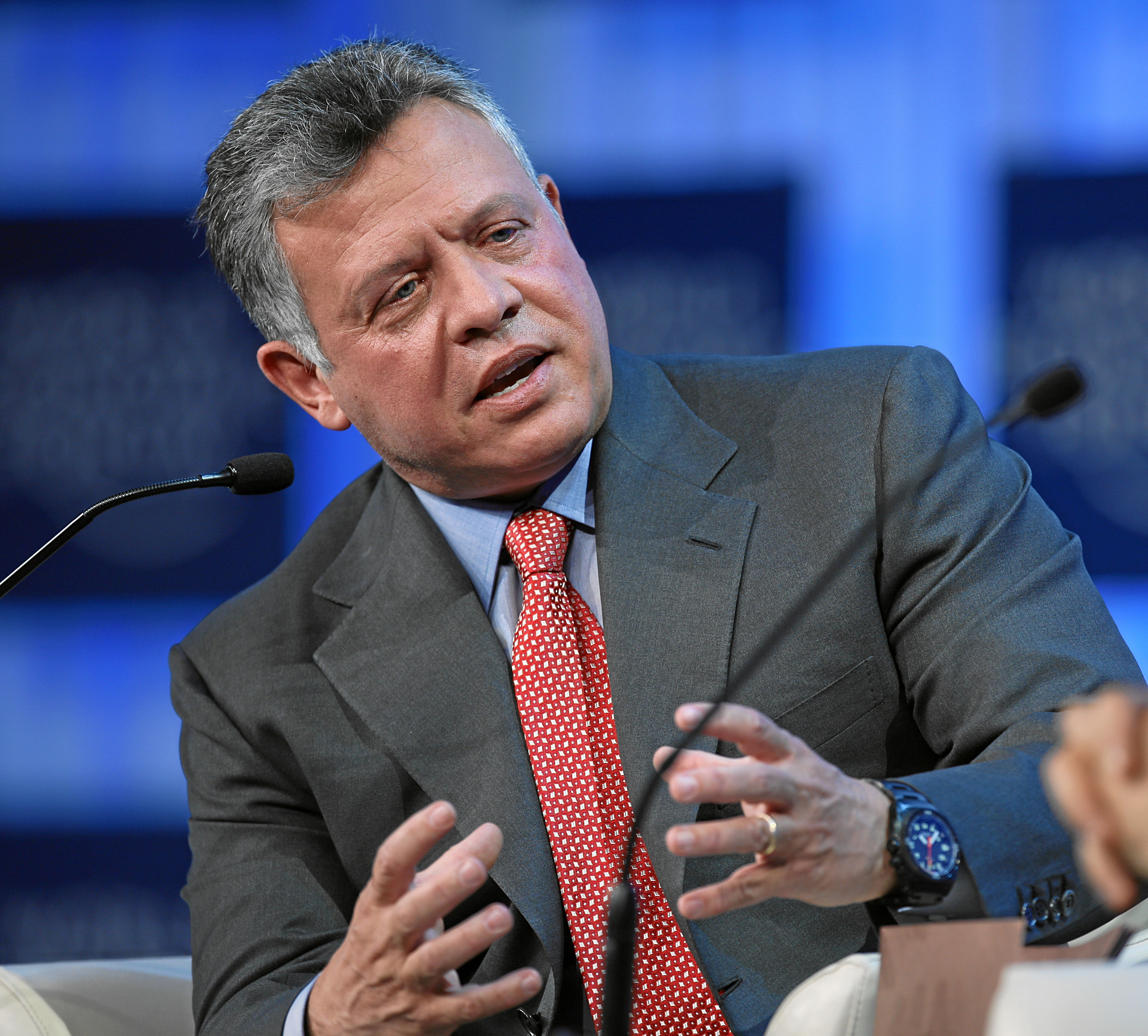
Abdullah speaking during a session of the World Economic Forum in Davos, 25 January 2013

The king launched a number of initiatives to provide housing for Jordanian citizens, including teachers and those serving in the armed forces. He established awards to encourage good citizenship, including the King Abdullah II Award for Physical Fitness, the King Abdullah II Award for Excellence in Government Performance and Transparency, the King Abdullah II Award for Excellence for the Private Sector and the King Abdullah II Award for Excellence for Business Associations. To combat unemployment, Abdullah established the National Vocational Training Council and formed a committee to develop a national strategy for developing human resources to produce a skilled workforce.

Jordan was dependent on subsidized Iraqi oil for its energy. The 2003 American invasion of Iraq halted the petroleum supply and drove Jordan to begin importing gas from Egypt in 2009. Insurgency in Sinai began when the Arab Spring spread to Egypt, where the Arab Gas Pipeline runs. Since 2011, the pipeline has been attacked over 30 times by ISIL's Sinai affiliates, and the pipeline was effectively closed in 2014. Jordan incurred $6 billion in losses. The Great Recession and regional turmoil triggered by the Arab Spring during the 2010s hobbled the Jordanian economy, making it increasingly reliant on foreign aid. The shocks hit Jordan's tourism sector (a cornerstone of the country's economy) hardest, and tourist arrivals have fallen by over 66 percent since 2011. However, in 2017, tourism started to pick up again. Growth of the Jordanian economy slowed to an annual average rate of 2.8 percent between 2010 and 2016—down from an average of 8% in previous years—insufficient to accommodate the exponential growth of the population.

Jordan's total foreign debt in 2012 was $22 billion, 72 percent of its GDP. In 2016, the debt reached $35.1 billion, 95 percent of the country's GDP. The increase was attributed to regional challenges, which decreased tourist activity and foreign investment and increased military spending; attacks on the Egyptian pipeline; the collapse of trade with Iraq and Syria; the expense of hosting Syrian refugees, and accumulated loan interest. According to the World Bank, Syrian refugees cost Jordan more than $2.5 billion a year (six percent of its GDP and 25 percent of the government's annual revenue). Foreign aid covers only a portion of these costs, 63 percent of which are borne by Jordan. An austerity program was adopted by the government which aims to reduce Jordan's debt-to-GDP ratio to 77 percent by 2021.

=== Political ===
Abdullah was criticized during his early years for focusing on economic, rather than political reform. A committee was formed in February 2005 to formulate a blueprint for political reform in the country for the next decade. This National Agenda, finalized about nine months later, was never implemented. It included incorporating proportional representation into general elections, improving the judicial branch and respect for human rights, and tackling issues related to employment, welfare, education and infrastructure. The Agenda was reportedly never implemented due to conservative opposition. After the Arab Spring, a new election law in 2012 was enacted and used in the 2013 elections. It incorporated elements of proportional representation, and 27 of the 150 House of Representatives members could be elected accordingly. A number of political reforms were undertaken to curtail some of the king's powers, including amending about one-third of the constitution, establishing a constitutional court and the Independent Election Commission and improvements to laws governing human rights and freedom of speech and assembly.

In 2014 and 2016, several constitutional amendments sparked controversy despite their overwhelming approval by senators and representatives. The amendments gave the king sole authority to appoint his crown prince, deputy, the chief and members of the constitutional court, the heads of the military and paramilitary forces and the country's General Intelligence Director. Proponents said that the amendments solidified the separation of powers, while critics claimed they were unconstitutional.

Reforms introduced in the 2016 general election led Freedom House, a US-funded non-governmental organization, to upgrade Jordan to "partly free" from "not free" in its Freedom in the World 2017 report. According to the report, Jordan became the third most free Arab country, and that the change was "due to electoral law changes that led to somewhat fairer parliamentary elections."

In September 2016, Abdullah formed a royal committee to make recommendations which would improve the country's judiciary. The committee finalized its report, which revolved around strengthening judicial independence and improving criminal justice, in February 2017. The Parliament approved the recommendations which included increased protection for women against violence and better trial procedures. A new law for people with disabilities was also enacted. Human Rights Watch praised the reforms.

On 15 August 2017, local elections were held for municipal councils, local councils, and governorate councils, which were added by a new decentralization law. The law intends to cede some central-government power to elected councils, increasing citizen participation in municipal decision-making. In a 15 August 2016 interview, Abdullah described the new decentralization law as "a very important link in the chain of reforms".

On 10 June 2021, Abdullah announced the introduction of a new committee of 92 members chaired by former prime minister Samir Rifai. The tasks of the committee are to modernise the political system and to propose new laws for local governments. On 4 October 2021, the committee handed over its recommendations to Abdullah. The committee proposed draft laws for political parties and elections, as well as 22 amendments to the Jordan constitution regarding parliamentary work and empowering women and youth. In November 2021, Abdullah ordered the government to push for political modernization. The Cabinet of Jordan submitted draft laws to the parliament following the committee's recommendations. In December 2021, a parliamentary discussion on the constitutional amendment that would give more rights to women resulted into a fistfight between members of parliament. On 3 January 2022, the Jordan parliament passed an amendment to Article 40 of the constitution, which allows Abdullah to appoint or dismiss the chief justice, the head of the Sharia judicial council, the Grand Mufti of Jordan, the chief of the Royal Court, the minister of the court, and the advisors to the king. On 6 January 2022, Jordan parliament approved constitutional reforms by a majority of 104-8 including improvement of women's rights, lowering the minimum age for elected deputies to 25 and the prime minister being elected by the assembly's largest single party.

=== Military ===
Due to his military background, Abdullah believes in a powerful military and has followed a "quality over quantity" policy. During the first year of his reign he established the King Abdullah Design and Development Bureau (now Jordan Design and Development Bureau), whose goal is to "provide an indigenous capability for the supply of scientific and technical services to the Jordanian Armed Forces". The company manufactures a wide variety of military products, which are presented at the biennial international Special Operations Forces Exhibition (SOFEX)—Abdullah is SOFEX's patron. Abdullah modernized the army, leading Jordan to acquire advanced weaponry and increase and enhance its F-16 fighter-jet fleet. The king occasionally trains with the Jordanian army in live ammunition military drills.

=== Energy sector ===
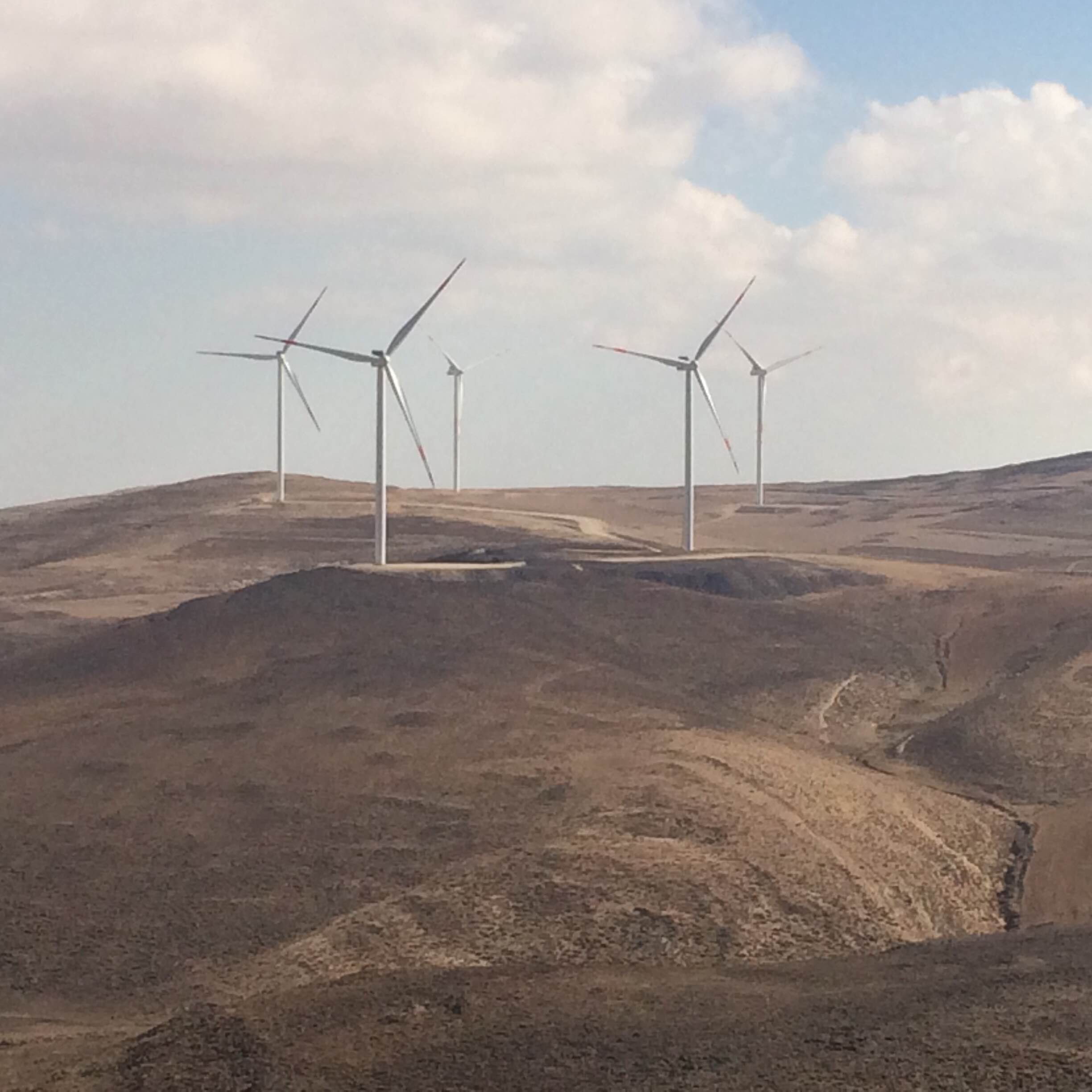
The 117 MW Tafila Wind Farm, inaugurated by Abdullah in 2014, is the largest onshore wind farm in the Middle East.

Vandalism of the Egyptian pipeline supplying Jordan strained the country's electrical company, whose debt increased substantially; this prompted Abdullah to urge the government to formulate a 10-year plan (2015–2025) to diversify the kingdom's energy sources.

In 2007, Abdullah said that Jordan intends to benefit from its large uranium reserves by building nuclear reactors to generate electricity; the country is one of the few non-petroleum-producing nations in the region. Early on, in a 2010 interview, Abdullah accused Israel of trying to disrupt Jordan's nuclear program. Abdullah inaugurated Jordan's first nuclear facility in 2016. The Jordan Research and Training Reactor, in the Jordan University of Science and Technology near Ar Ramtha, aims to train Jordanian students in the school's nuclear-engineering program. In 2018, the country's Atomic Energy Commission announced that Jordan was in talks with multiple companies to build the first commercial nuclear plant, a Helium-cooled reactor that is scheduled for completion in 2025.

The country has 330 days of sunshine per year, and wind speeds exceed 7 m/s in mountainous areas. During the 2010s, Abdullah inaugurated the 117 MW Tafila Wind Farm and the 53 MW Shams Ma'an Power Plant. In May 2017, it was announced that more than 200 MW of solar energy projects had been completed. After having initially set the percentage of renewable energy Jordan aimed to generate by 2020 at 10%, the government announced in 2018 that it sought to beat that figure and aim for 20%. A report by pv magazine described Jordan as the "Middle East's solar powerhouse".

In 2014, a declaration of intent was signed by Jordan's national electrical company and Noble Energy to import gas from Israel's offshore Leviathan gas field, a 15-year deal estimated at $10 billion. The move provoked outrage by opponents, including the Boycott, Divestment and Sanctions movement, which said that the agreement favored Israel and its occupation of the West Bank and accused the government of ignoring renewable-energy options. The agreement, effective in 2019, was signed in September 2016. Separately, Abdullah opened a liquefied natural gas port in Aqaba in 2015, allowing Jordan to import LNG. LNG-generated electricity saves Jordan about $1 million a day, and is reportedly better for the environment.

== Religious affairs ==
Our faith, like yours, commands mercy, peace and tolerance. It upholds, as yours does, the equal human dignity of every person – men and women, neighbours and strangers. Those outlaws of Islam who deny these truths are vastly outnumbered by the ocean of believers – 1.6 billion Muslims worldwide. In fact, these terrorists have made the world's Muslims their greatest target. We will not allow them to hijack our faith.

— Abdullah's 15 March 2015 speech before the European Parliament in Strasbourg, France

In response to Islamophobic rhetoric after the 11 September attacks, Abdullah issued the Amman Message in November 2004. The Message is a detailed statement which encouraged Muslim scholars of all sects from around the world to denounce terrorism, practice religious tolerance and represent the true nature of the Muslim faith. The statement was adopted unanimously in a conference hosted by Abdullah in Amman in 2005 by 200 leading Islamic scholars. The Message stressed three points: the validity of all eight schools of Islam, the forbidding of takfir (declaration of apostasy) and standards for the issuance of fatwas. The Islamic religious consensus was unprecedented in contemporary times. Abdullah presented the Message in 2010 to the United Nations General Assembly, where he proposed a World Interfaith Harmony Week. The initiative was adopted, and is an annual celebration during the first week of February to promote peace and harmony among people of different faiths. Abdullah also established an award, based on this initiative, for interfaith dialogue.

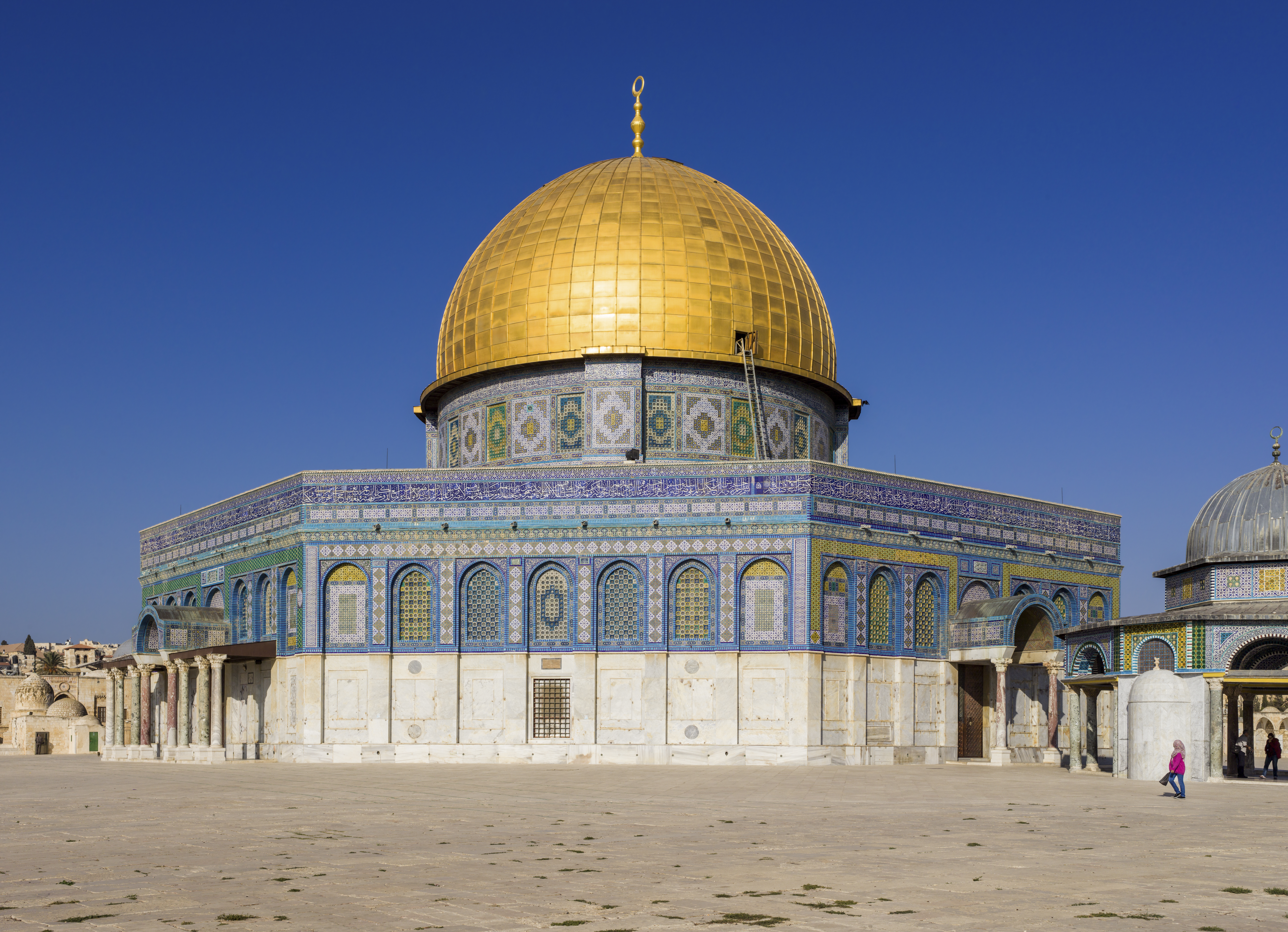
The Dome of the Rock and other Muslim and Christian religious sites in Jerusalem are in the custody of Abdullah, a position held by his dynasty since 1924.

The Al-Aqsa compound in Jerusalem was under Jordanian rule from 1948 to 1967; it was under Hashemite custodianship since 1924, during the reign of Abdullah's great-great-grandfather Sharif Hussein bin Ali. The legacy began when the Supreme Muslim Council, the highest body in charge of Muslim community affairs in Mandatory Palestine, accepted the sharif as custodian of the site. He restored the Jami’ Al-Aqsa and other mosques in Palestine. The sharif's son, King Abdullah I, is said to have personally taken charge of efforts to extinguish a fire which engulfed the Church of the Holy Sepulchre in 1949. Jami’ Al-Aqsa and the Dome of the Rock were restored four times by the Hashemites during the 20th century, and the custodianship became a Hashemite legacy given by Jordanian kings. In 2013, an agreement was signed between the Palestinian Authority and Abdullah, replacing the decades-old verbal agreement which was reinforced by the 1994 Israel–Jordan peace treaty. Jordan recalled its ambassador to Israel in 2014 following tensions at Al-Aqsa Mosque between Israelis and Palestinians concerned about Jordan's role in safeguarding Muslim and Christian sacred sites in Jerusalem. Abdullah met Israeli prime minister Benjamin Netanyahu in Amman in late 2014, and the Jordanian ambassador returned when Israeli authorities eased restrictions and revoked a decision that prevented men of all ages from praying at Al-Aqsa—for the first time in months.

In 2016, it was announced that Abdullah would fund the restoration of the Tomb of Jesus in the Church of the Holy Sepulchre. The Royal Hashemite Court informed Orthodox Patriarch Theophilos III of Jerusalem of the makruma (royal benefaction) in a 10 April 2016 letter. The tomb had been untouched since 1947, when the British installed steel support beams as part of a restoration project which never took place. It was reopened to the public on 22 March 2017 after the renovation. On 2 August 2017, Abdullah donated $1.4 million to the Jerusalem Islamic Waqf, the body that belongs to Jordan and is responsible for administering the Al-Aqsa mosque compound. An independent report estimates the total amount that the Hashemites have spent since 1924 on administering and renovating Jami’ Al Aqsa as over $1 billion.

In 2014, Abdullah received Pope Francis in Jordan, the third papal visit of his reign. The king, Queen Rania and Prince Ghazi accompanied the pope to Al-Maghtas, the site of Jesus' baptism, on the east bank of the Jordan River.

Abdullah led The 500 Most Influential Muslims' 2016 list, published by the Royal Islamic Strategic Studies Center, and was third on its 2018 list. Queen Rania was 35th on the 2016 list.

Leaders of the Church of the Holy Sepulchre sent out a letter of support to Abdullah on 1 March 2018 after Israel shelved a proposed bill that aimed to propose new tax measures to churches in the West Bank. "Your defence of religious freedom and Your leadership, in ensuring that the Status Quo is respected and maintained, has been crucial in our ongoing attempts to guard and protect the Christian presence especially in the Holy City of Jerusalem", the letter read.

== Successor ==
On 28 November 2004, Abdullah removed the title of crown prince from his half-brother, Prince Hamzah, whom he had appointed on 7 February 1999 in accordance with their father's advice. In a letter to Hamzah read on Jordanian state television, Abdullah said: "Your holding this symbolic position has restrained your freedom and hindered our entrusting you with certain responsibilities that you are fully qualified to undertake." Although no successor to the title was named at that time, the king was expected to appoint his son and heir apparent, Prince Hussein, crown prince. Hussein received the title on 2 July 2009.

== Personal life ==
King Abdullah met Rania Al-Yassin at a dinner party in January 1993. On 10 June 1993, they were married at Zahran Palace. King Abdullah and Queen Rania have four children:

- Crown Prince Hussein (born 28 June 1994 at King Hussein Medical Center in Amman), married Rajwa Al Saif on 1 June 2023 at Zahran Palace in Amman, they have one daughter:
  - Princess Iman bint Al Hussein (born 3 August 2024 at King Hussein Medical Center in Amman)
- Princess Iman (born 27 September 1996 at King Hussein Medical Center in Amman), married Jameel Alexander Thermiótis on 12 March 2023 at Beit Al Urdun Palace in Amman, they have three daughters:
  - Amina Thermiótis (born 16 February 2025 at Prince Hashem bin Abdullah II Hospital in Aqaba)
  - Talia Thermiótis (born 14 August 2026)
  - Rania Thermiótis (born 14 August 2026)
- Princess Salma (born 26 September 2000 at King Hussein Medical Center in Amman)
- Prince Hashem (born 30 January 2005 at King Hussein Medical Center in Amman)

The ruler of Dubai, Sheikh Mohammed Al-Maktoum, was married to Abdullah's half-sister Princess Haya.

Abdullah published an autobiography, Our Last Best Chance: The Pursuit of Peace in a Time of Peril, in 2010. He documents the first decade of his rule in a manner similar to his father's 1962 book, Uneasy Lies the Head. Abdullah's book contains insights into his childhood and behind-the-scenes accounts of encounters with political figures.

=== Interests ===
Abdullah has listed skydiving, motorcycling, water sports and collecting ancient weapons as his interests and hobbies, and is a fan of the science-fiction series Star Trek. In 1996, he appeared briefly in the Star Trek: Voyager episode "Investigations", in a non-speaking role.

The king promotes tourism in Jordan, and was a tour guide for Discovery Channel travel host Peter Greenberg on Jordan: The Royal Tour. In the program, Abdullah said that he is no longer permitted to skydive since he became king. He reportedly motorcycled through northern California on a Harley-Davidson. Prince Ali bin Al Hussein, one of Abdullah's brothers and president of the Jordan Football Association, has said that the king is the Jordan national football team's biggest fan. His interest in the film industry influenced his decision to create the Red Sea Institute of Cinematic Arts in the Red Sea coastal town of Aqaba on 20 September 2006, in partnership with the University of Southern California School of Cinematic Arts. When the producers of Transformers: Revenge of the Fallen decided to film in Jordan, Abdullah called on military helicopters to help transport equipment into Petra. In 2016, the king honored the cast of Theeb, the first Jordanian film nominated for an Oscar.

Abdullah also enjoys stand-up comedy. When Gabriel Iglesias, Russell Peters and a number of other stand-up comedians visited Jordan for a 2009 comedy festival, the king invited them over for dinner. In 2013, a video of Abdullah helping push a car stuck in snow in Amman during the 2013 Middle East cold snap went viral. In 2017, another amateur video that went viral showed Abdullah wearing pyjamas helping in extinguishing a fire in a wood near the royal palace.

=== Wealth ===
Abdullah owns an international network of real estate properties, valued in excess of $100 million. His ownership of the properties was disguised through a series of offshore companies incorporated in the British Virgin Islands. Abdullah's property empire was disclosed in the Pandora Papers leak, which revealed ownership of three contiguous oceanfront estates in the Point Dume area of Malibu, and properties in Washington, D.C., London and Ascot. His lawyers denied any misuse of public funds or tax evasion and stated that they were bought from the monarch's private wealth and through offshore companies for security and privacy reasons. A 2022 Credit Suisse leak revealed that Abdullah owned six secret accounts, including one whose balance exceeded $224 million. A Royal Court statement said that the funds were a result of selling an Airbus A340 plane that belonged to his father the late King Hussein for $212 million, and that it was replaced with a smaller, less costly Gulfstream aircraft.

== Honours and awards ==
=== Honours ===
==== National honours ====
- Jordan:
  - Grand Master of the Order of Al-Hussein bin Ali
  - Grand Master of the Supreme Order of the Renaissance
  - Grand Master of the Order of the Hashemite Star
  - Grand Master of the Order of Military Gallantry
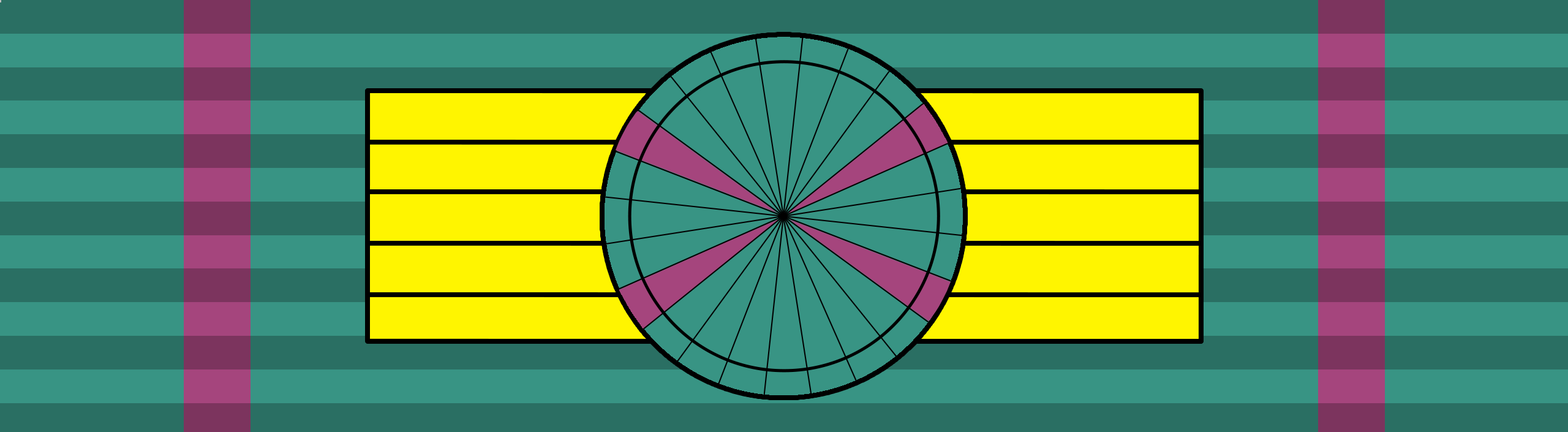
  - Grand Master of the Order of the Star of Jordan
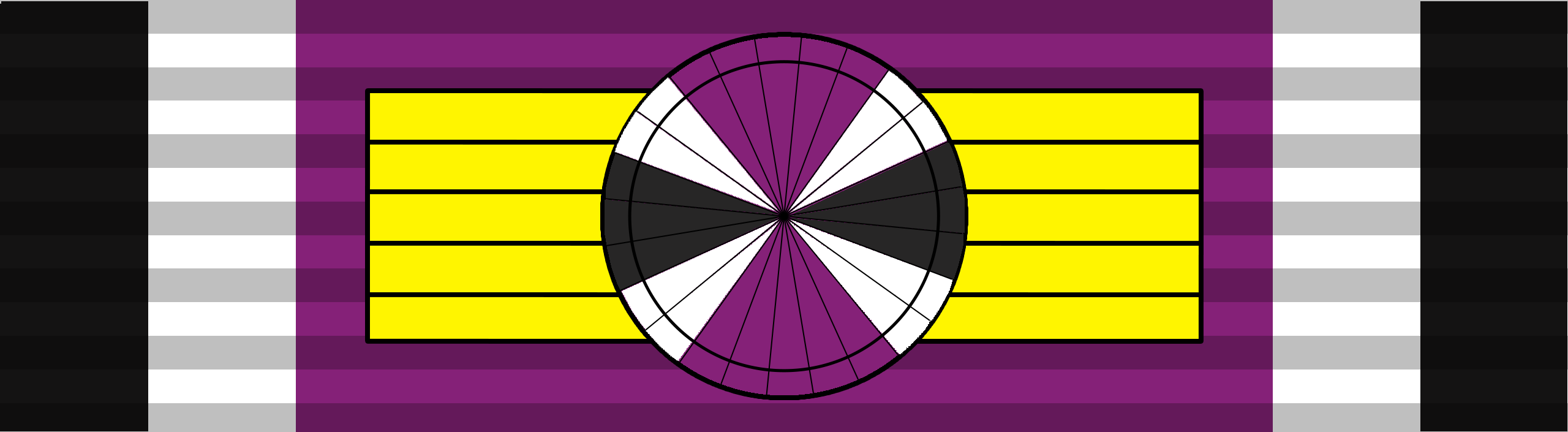
  - Grand Master of the Order of Independence
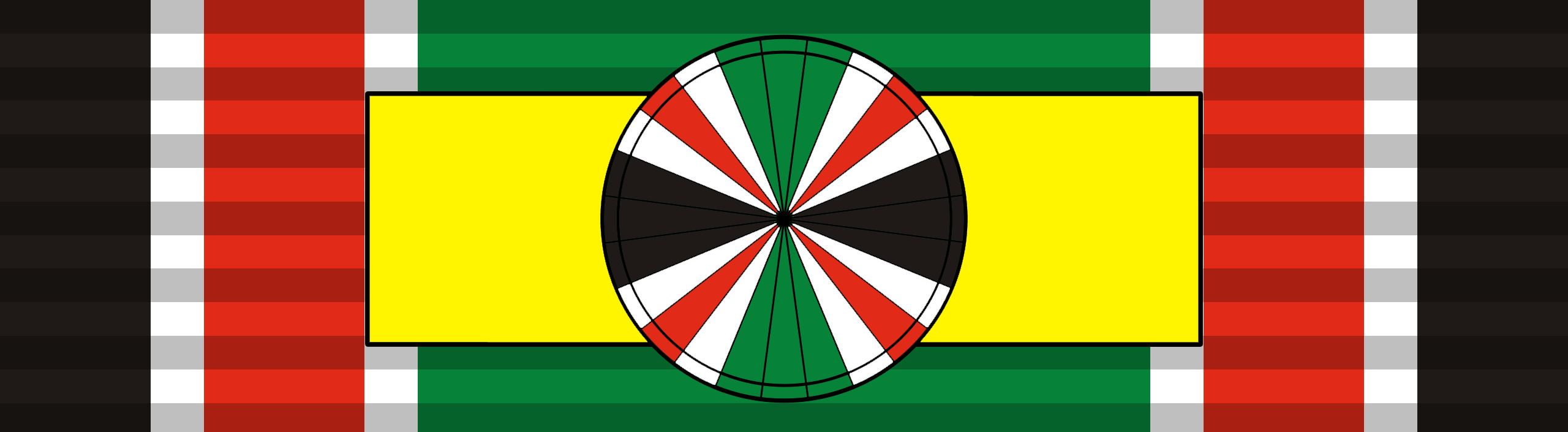
  - Grand Master of the Order of Military Merit
  - Grand Master of the Order of Al Hussein
  - Founding Grand Master of the King Abdullah II ibn Al Hussein Order for Distinction
  - Founding Grand Master of the Order of the State Centennial
  - Sovereign of the Al-Hussein Medal of Excellence
  - Sovereign of the Long Service Medal
  - Sovereign of the Administrative & Leadership Competence Medal
  - Sovereign of the Administrative & Technical Competence Medal
  - Sovereign of the Administrative & Training Competence Medal

==== Foreign honours ====
Algeria:

- Grand Collar of the National Order of Merit (4 December 2022)

Austria:

- Grand Star of the Decoration of Honour for Services to the Republic of Austria (January 2001)

Bahrain:

- Grand Cordon with Collar of the Order of Al-Khalifa (4 November 1999)

Belgium:

- Grand Cordon of the Order of Leopold (18 May 2016)

Brunei:

- Recipient of the Royal Family Order of the Crown of Brunei (13 May 2008)

Cyprus:

- Grand Collar of the Order of Makarios III (17 December 2021)

Czech Republic:

- Member 1st Class of the Order of the White Lion (11 February 2015)

Finland:

- Grand Cross with Collar of the Order of the White Rose (10 October 2010)

Georgia:

- Recipient of the Order of the Golden Fleece (29 May 2022)

Germany:

- Grand Cross Special Class of the Order of Merit of the Federal Republic (10 October 2002)

Guinea Bissau:

- Recipient of the Medal of Amílcar Cabral (20 February 2023)

Italy:

- Knight Grand Cross with Collar of the Order of Merit of the Italian Republic (9 February 2001)
- Knight Grand Cross of the Order of Merit of the Italian Republic (15 January 1987)

Japan:

- Collar of the Supreme Order of the Chrysanthemum (30 November 1999)
- Grand Cordon of the Supreme Order of the Chrysanthemum (November 1993)

Kazakhstan:

- Recipient of the 10 Years of Astana Medal (18 May 2008)

Lebanon:

- Member Extraordinary Grade of the Order of Merit of Lebanon (14 September 1999)

Libya:

- Member 1st Class of the Order of the Grand Conqueror (1 September 1999)

Malaysia:

- Grand Cordon of the Order of the Crown of the Realm (12 October 2026)

Montenegro:

- Member 1st Class of the Order of the Republic of Montenegro (2017)

Morocco:

- Collar of the Order of Muhammad (2021)
- Grand Cordon of the Order of the Throne (28 March 2019)

Netherlands:

- Knight Grand Cross of the Order of the Netherlands Lion (30 October 2006)
- Grand Cross of the Order of the House of Orange (7 December 1994)

Norway:

- Grand Cross with Collar of the Royal Norwegian Order of Saint Olav (4 April 2000)

Oman:

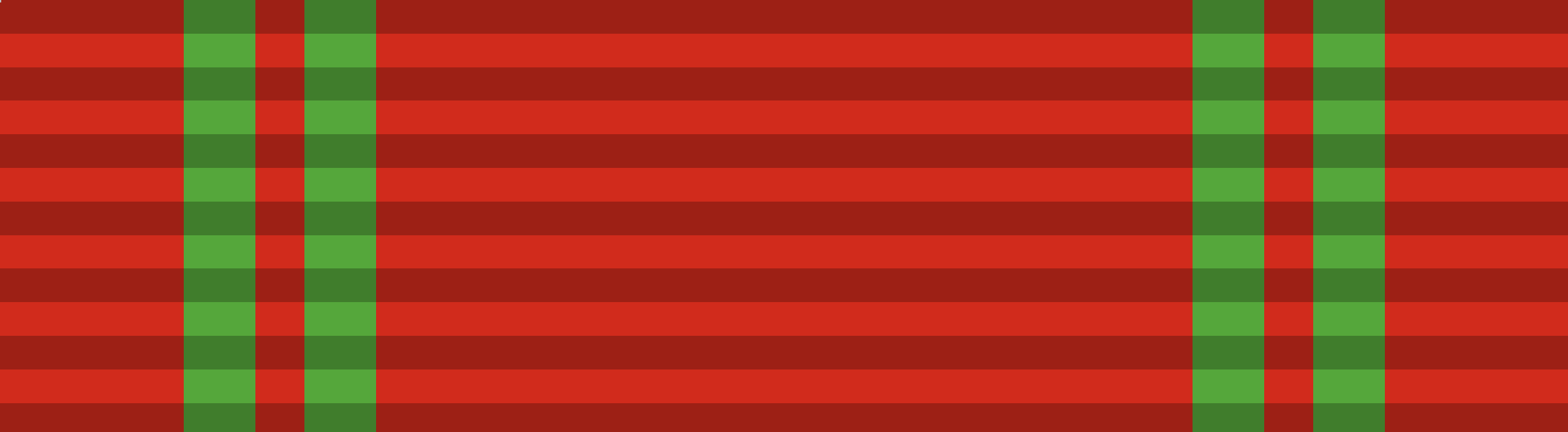
- Member Special Class of the Civil Order of Oman (4 October 2022)
- Collar of the Order of Al Said (22 May 2024)

Pakistan:

- Nishan-e-Pakistan (16 November 2025)

Palestine:

- Grand Cordon of the Order of Jerusalem (21 November 2011)

Peru:

- Grand Cross of the Order of the Sun of Peru (31 May 2005)

Poland:

- Knight of the Order of the White Eagle (26 September 1999)

Portugal:

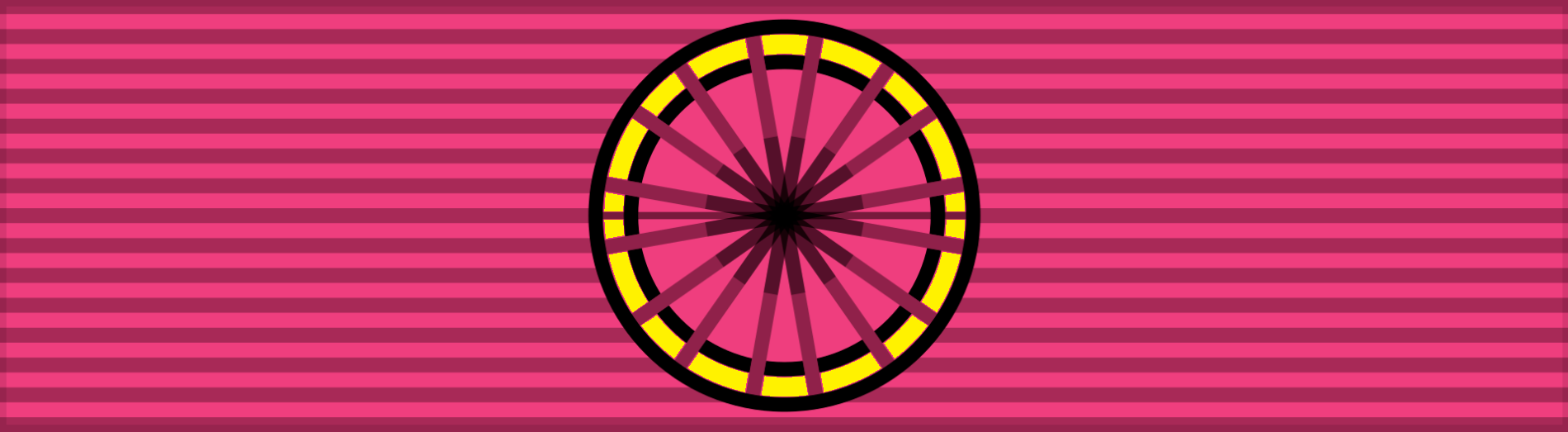
- Grand Collar of the Military Order of Saint James of the Sword (16 March 2009)
- Grand Collar of the Order of Prince Henry (5 March 2008)

Romania:

- Collar of the Order of the Star of Romania (20 December 2005)

Slovenia:

- Gold Medal of the Order of Freedom of the Republic of Slovenia (21 February 2002)

South Korea:

- Recipient of Grand Order of Mugunghwa (4 December 1999)

Spain:

- Knight of the Collar of the Royal and Distinguished Spanish Order of Charles III (21 April 2006)
- Knight of the Collar of the Royal Order of the Isabella the Catholic (18 October 1999)
- Knight Grand Cross of the Order of Naval Merit, with white distinctive (15 September 1995)
- Knight Grand Cross of the Order of Aeronautical Merit, with white distinctive (23 December 1999)

Sweden:

- Knight of the Royal Order of the Seraphim (7 October 2003)

Tunisia:

- Grand Cordon of the Order of the Republic (20 October 2015)

Ukraine:

- Member 1st Class of the Order of Merit (22 June 2011)
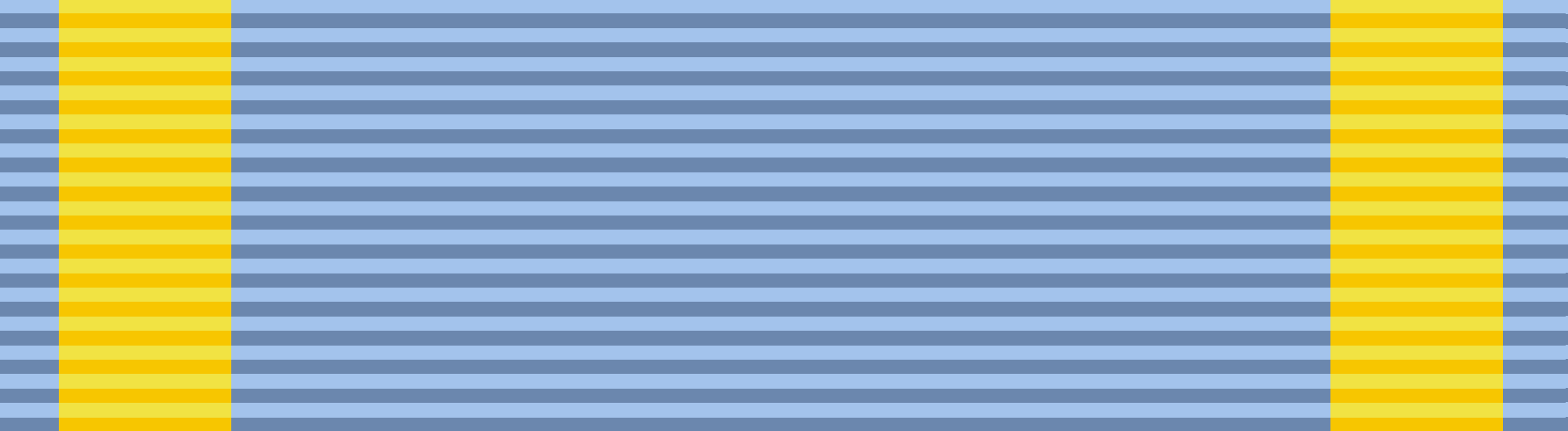
- Member 1st Class of the Order of Prince Yaroslav the Wise (23 April 2002)

United Arab Emirates:

- Collar of the Order of Zayed (1 November 2023)

United Kingdom:

- Honorary Knight Grand Cross of the Most Honourable Order of the Bath, Military Class (GCB, 6 November 2001)
- Honorary Knight Grand Cross of the Most Distinguished Order of Saint Michael and Saint George (GCMG, 12 May 1999)
- Honorary Knight Grand Cross of the Royal Victorian Order (GCVO, 13 November 2024)
- Honorary Knight Commander of the Royal Victorian Order (KCVO, 26 March 1984)
- Recipient of the Sandhurst Medal

=== Honorary degrees ===
- 1 January 2001: Doctorate in political sciences, University of Jordan.
- 3 September 2004: Doctorate, International Relations Institute in Moscow.
- 21 March 2005: Doctor of Humane Letters for socioeconomic development in Jordan and promoting interfaith dialogue, Georgetown University.
- 15 December 2005: Doctorate in political sciences, Chulalongkorn University in Thailand.
- 4 June 2008: Doctorate in civil law, University of Oxford.
- 8 November 2011: Doctorate in humanitarian sciences for efforts in defending Jerusalem's holy sites, Al-Quds University (represented by Palestinian president Mahmoud Abbas).

=== Honorary military appointments ===
United Kingdom

- (United Kingdom) Since 19 August 2003: Colonel-in-Chief of The Light Dragoons, British Army

=== Awards ===
- 16 March 2002: Young Presidents Organisation's Global Leadership Award (California).
- 30 September 2003: Sorbonne Association for Foreign Policy award for political courage in France.
- 20 October 2003: Pioneer in E-Business award, Arab Business magazine (United Arab Emirates).
- 16 April 2004: INFORUM 21st-Century Award from the Commonwealth Club of California, awarded to young leaders who strive for positive change.
- 9 June 2004: Golden Shield Award (Chicago) for efforts to stabilize the Middle East.
- June 2004: Academy of Achievement Golden Plate Award for Achievement.
- On 21 March 2005: Franklin Delano Roosevelt International Disability Award, United Nations.
- 21 June 2005: Simon Wiesenthal Center Tolerance Award.
- 21 December 2005: Golden Medal of Athens Award.
- 8 May 2007: Peacemaker Award, Seeds of Peace.
- 8 October 2016: Peace of Westphalia Prize, Germany; German president Joachim Gauck said that Abdullah and the Jordanians set "standards for humanity" with their response to the refugee crisis.
- 16 November 2016: Peace prize (Kazakhstan) for contributions to security and nuclear disarmament.
- 19 January 2017: Abu Bakr Al Siddeiq Medal (First Class) from the Arab Red Crescent and Red Cross Organisation for Jordan's support of the Palestinian people and efforts on behalf of Syrian refugees.
- 27 June 2018: Templeton Prize for promoting inter-faith dialogue, the awarding statement said that Abdullah "has done more to seek religious harmony within Islam and between Islam and other religions than any other living political leader."
- 21 November 2019: Scholar-Statesman Award from The Washington Institute for Near East Policy.
- 9 May 2022: Path to Peace award from the Path to Peace Foundation of the Permanent Observer of the Holy See to the United Nations.

== Writings ==
- Abdullah II of Jordan (2012). Our Last Best Chance: The Pursuit of Peace in a Time of Peril. Penguin Books. ISBN 978-0-14-104879-6.
- Abdullah II of Jordan, "Document Papers", Encyclopedia, Official website of King (Jordan)

== See also ==
- List of things named after King Abdullah II

== Bibliography ==
- Robins, Philip (2004). A History of Jordan. Cambridge University Press. ISBN 978-0521598958.
- George, Alan (2005). Jordan: Living in the Crossfire. Zed Books. ISBN 978-1842774717.
- Shlaim, Avi (2009). Lion of Jordan: The Life of King Hussein in War and Peace. Vintage Books. ISBN 978-1400078288.

Abdullah II House of Hashim Born: 30 January 1962
Regnal titles
| Preceded by Hussein | King of Jordan; 1999–present | Incumbent; Heir apparent: Hussein bin Abdullah |
