= Prince Hashem bin Abdullah =

Jordanian prince (born 2005)

- Born: 30 January 2005 (age 21); Amman, Jordan
Names
- Hashem bin Abdullah bin Hussein bin Talal
- House: Hashemite
- Father: Abdullah II bin Al-Hussein
- Mother: Rania Al-Yassin
- Religion: Islam

Prince Hashem bin Abdullah (Arabic: هاشم بن عبد الله; born 30 January 2005) is the youngest child and second son of King Abdullah II of Jordan and Queen Rania. He is a member of the Hashemite dynasty, who have been the reigning royal family of Jordan since 1921, and is considered a 42nd-generation direct descendant of the Islamic prophet Muhammad.

== Early life ==
Prince Hashem bin Abdullah was born on 30 January 2005 at King Hussein Medical Center in Amman, Jordan. He is the youngest child of King Abdullah II and Queen Rania and a member of the Hashemite family. His paternal grandfather was the late King Hussein, and his grandmother is Princess Muna, who was born in Britain and was King Hussein’s second wife. Prince Hashem’s elder siblings are Crown Prince Hussein, Princess Iman, and Princess Salma.

== Education and royal duties ==
Hashem studied at King's Academy, a boarding school in Madaba and graduated in May 2023.

In June 2023, Prince Hashem accompanied his parents, the King and Queen on an official visit to Spain, marking his official international debut. The prince previously visited Egypt and Bahrain with his father.

On 14 August 2023, Prince Hashem was sworn in as regent for the first time, after King Abdullah II left for Egypt to participate in a summit.

He is currently pursuing his higher education at Georgetown University in Washington, D.C., United States.

On 14 June 2024, Prince Hashem was sworn in as regent to the King for the second time, in the presence of the Cabinet, as King Abdullah II left for Italy to participate in the G7 Summit, invited by Italian Prime Minister Giorgia Meloni.

In August 2026, Prince Hashem accompanied his father and his sister Princess Salma on a diplomatic visit to China, including a meeting with Chinese President Xi Jinping.

== Military career ==
On 6 September 2021, Hashem was commissioned in the Jordanian Armed Forces as second lieutenant.

Royal titles
Preceded by Prince Hussein bin Al Abdullah	Line of succession to the Jordanian throne 2nd position	Succeeded by Prince Faisal bin Al Hussein
