= Our Last Best Chance =

2011 book by Abdoellah II van Jordanië

- Author: King Abdullah II of Jordan
- Language: English
- Subject: Peace in the Middle East
- Publisher: Viking Adult
- Publication date: February 22, 2011
- Publication place: Jordan
- Media type: Hardcover, E-book, Audio CD, Audiobook
- Pages: 368 pages
- ISBN: 978-0-670-02171-0

Our Last Best Chance: The Pursuit of Peace in a Time of Peril (Arabic: فرصتنا الأخيرة: السعي نحو السلام في وقت الخطر) is a book written by King Abdullah II of Jordan and published by Viking Press in New York City. The book, available in eight languages, highlights King Abdullah's vision towards resolving the Arab–Israeli conflict, as well as the challenges facing the Middle East.

== Book contents ==
In Our Last Best Chance, King Abdullah writes as both a monarch and as a man whose life has been affected by war. The memoir opens during the 1967 war, when a childhood incident during an Israeli air raid highlights the Israeli-Palestinian conflict in the region. The King goes on to detail his formative years, from his time at a US boarding school to his military career in Zarqa and his marriage proposal to Rania Yassin on Tal Rumman.

In the first two parts of the memoir, covering the King's childhood up to his ascension to the Throne, King Hussein offers his son lessons in diplomacy. When King Hussein falls ill, and King Hussein changes the line of succession two weeks before his death, King Abdullah provides an account of how he faced the sudden responsibility of becoming King while coming to terms with his father's death. Upon ascending to the Throne, reforming the country's economy was a top priority, the King writes, listing Jordan's membership in the World Trade Organization and the US Free Trade Agreement among his top achievements in his first years. King Abdullah goes on to highlight Jordanian success stories, including Maktoob.com, Rubicon, the King's Academy, the King Abdullah Design Bureau, the domestic film industry and the peaceful nuclear program, taking clear pride in each as a success for the country, each innovation as a step forward in the Kingdom's development process. But, as the King notes, governance is not as orderly as the army. Directives go unheeded, deadlines are missed and rather than bullets or mortars, progress is threatened by excuses and delays.

Despite economic reform, King Abdullah admits that political reform in the Kingdom over the past decade has at times been "two steps forward, one step back". "Some have resisted change out of fear of losing privileges they have long enjoyed, while others simply lacked imagination," King Abdullah writes. "Some officials did not have the courage to push forward with difficult changes." The Monarch goes on to note a "dysfunctional" relationship between executive and legislative authorities, "hindering efforts to address broader social and economic issues". He notes that such tensions and the public's loss of faith in the 15th Parliament in 2009 led to its dissolution. While delving into affairs at home, the memoir also sheds light on life as the head of state in a dangerous neighbourhood. The country is tested by the fallout of the US invasion of Iraq, followed by the Lebanon-Israeli conflict and the war on Gaza. The King notes that in each conflict, Jordan played a role larger than its size, sending medical aid and field hospitals, organizing aid convoys, repairing airports and hosting thousands of refugees.

Our Last Best Chance goes on to highlight Jordan's role in combating takfiri ideology and presents the alternative of the Amman Message. In the closing chapters, the King focuses on the peace process: warning that the negotiations launched by the Obama administration in late 2009 may be the last call for a region that has been disappointed time and time again by diplomatic failure. The King details the hurdles facing the launch of negotiations, including pressure from Arab states to revoke the Arab Peace Initiative over the Gaza war and the Israeli Prime Minister Benjamin Netanyahu. The King warns that at the time of printing, hopes for a breakthrough were fading and negotiations were "on the verge of collapse". Indeed, talks have since derailed, and the forecasts for a return to the negotiating table have been less than promising. Reflecting on King Hussein's four decades and his own 11-year pursuit of peace, the Monarch voices hope that Crown Prince Hussein will not have to face the lingering effects of a conflict whose resolution has eluded generations. In order to end the impasse, the Monarch touts the "57-state solution", or the Arab Peace Initiative, whereby Arab and Muslim states agree to normalize relations with Israel in return for occupied lands and a Palestinian state on 1967 borders. The King remains blunt about the current situation: "I fear that we are slipping into the darkness." Despite the talk of benchmarks and roadmaps, the King argues that leaders and politicians must bear the responsibility of making the "much eroded dream" of peace come true.

In the book, the King uses plain language to explain his view of the complex past, present and future of the region, choosing the steady tone of a commander rather than the prose of a politician. While largely steering away from the sentimental, the Monarch does offer some intimate accounts of larger-than-life figures; dynamite fishing with Uday and Qusay Hussein, disagreements with former US President George Bush and Yasser Arafat's escape from Jordan in the guise of a woman. The King also delves into his relationship with family members, telling of parachuting with Princess Aisha and the tensions raised by the question of the line of succession. Despite the insightful asides, the memoir's lasting impressions are lessons from a man and a country who although have been blessed to live in peace and security are touched by the conflicts of its neighbours.

Along with a personal history, the King's first book serves as a message for Washington policy makers, Israeli politicians and Arab leaders to sit up, take notice and not miss "our last, best chance".

== Reviews ==
The Globe and Mail published a supportive but also mixed review by Michael D. Bell, a scholar in international diplomacy at the University of Windsor. Bell stated that he found "value and veracity in much of" the book, and he commented as well that the King "may prove as successful as his father, if not more so." Bell criticized the book for the lack of detail about the King's important relationship with his mother, Princess Muna, and his English grandfather, Tony Gardner, as well as for displaying a "paternalism... by personalizing good governance in a single all-powerful individual."

The Spectator published a positive review by journalist Justin Marozzi. Marozzi referred to it as an "engrossing book" that "avowedly mixes the personal with the political." Marozzi highlighted in particular the King's depiction of him and his four brothers as the five fingers on a hand- with the King saying "If you are well-meaning, we extend the hand of friendship; but when outsiders try to harm the family, we band together and become a fist."
