= List of things named after King Abdullah II =

This is a list of places, buildings, roads and other things named for King Abdullah II. It is divided by category, though each item's location is noted in the entry.

== Institutions ==
- King Abdullah II Design and Development Bureau (now Jordan Design and Development Bureau)

== Buildings ==
- King Abdullah II Stadium
