= Jordanian Royal Medical Services =

- Active: 1941 - present day
- Country: Jordan
- Branch: Jordanian Armed Forces

The Jordanian Royal Medical Services (JRMS) is a body of the Jordanian Armed Forces responsible for providing medical care and health protection to members of the armed forces, security services, retired military personnel and their families, in addition to providing medical services to the broader Jordanian population.

The Royal Medical Services is currently headed by Brigadier-General Doctor Adel Al-Whadneh, who assumed the position on March 2, 2020, succeeding Major-General Shawkat Al-Tamimi, who was referred to retirement.
