= King Hussein Medical City =

King Hussein Medical City مدينة الحسين الطبية
- Jordanian Royal Medical Services
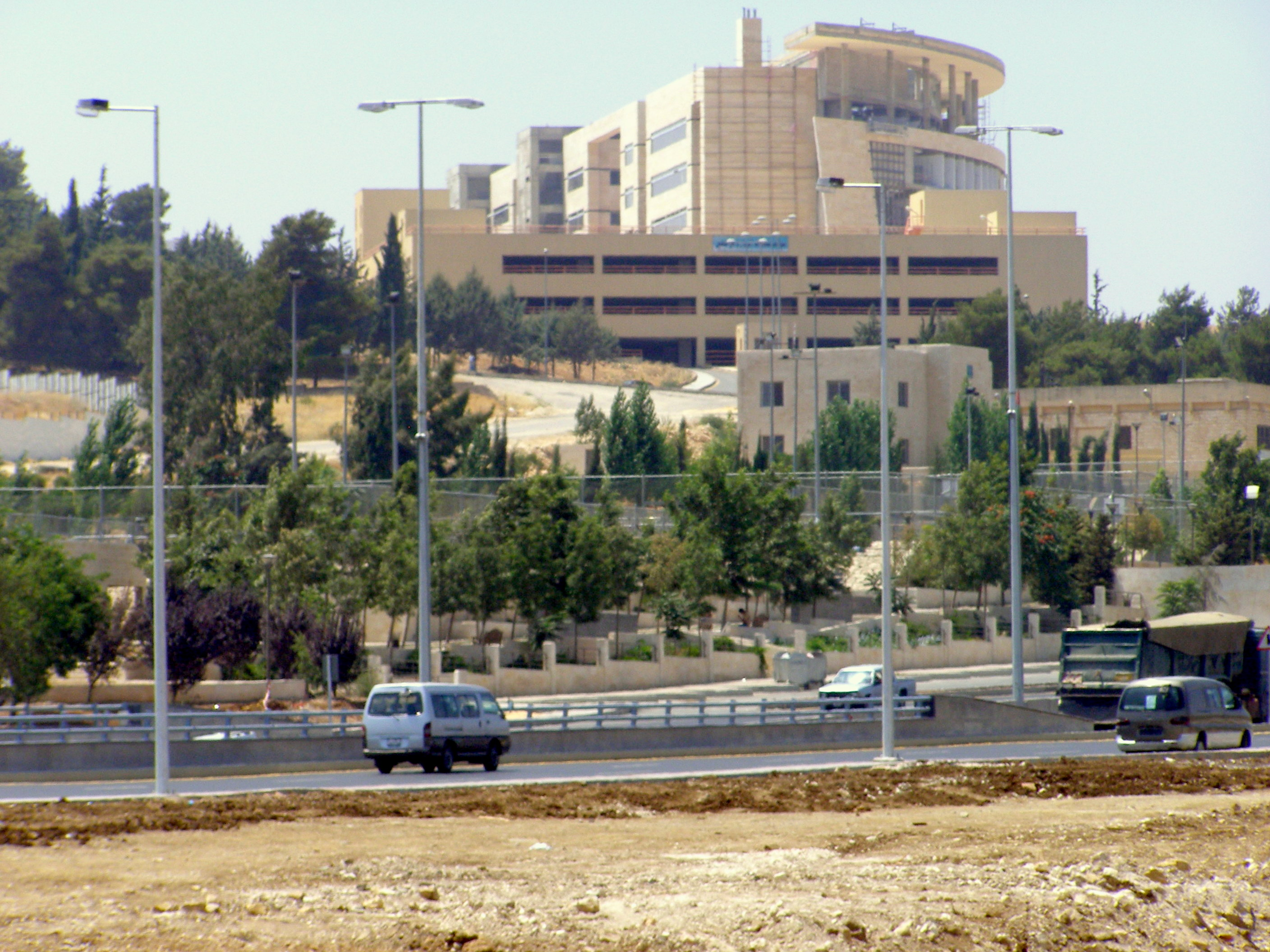

Geography
- Location: Wadi As Seer, Amman, Jordan

Organisation
- Care system: Public Hospital
- Type: Military, District General

Services
- Emergency department: Yes
- Beds: 1414

History
- Founded: 1973

Links
- Website: www.jrms.gov.jo
- Lists: Hospitals in Jordan

King Hussein Medical City (Arabic: مدينة الحسين الطبية) is a military medical complex that has five hospitals situated in Amman, Jordan. It is affiliated with the Jordanian Royal Medical Services, a body of the Jordanian Armed Forces responsible for providing medical care and health protection to members of the armed forces, security services, retired military personnel and their families, in addition to providing medical services to the broader Jordanian population hospitals. JRMS has a wide network of hospitals distributed in different provinces across Jordan.

== Facilities ==
The King Hussein Medical City has five hospitals, which in total have 1414 beds. It also includes a reference center for laboratory studies on the regional level. The hospitals are listed below:

- Al-Hussein Hospital: It was founded in 1973 and was the first general hospital at King Hussein Medical City. It had 720 beds, It is one of Jordan's busiest general hospitals, with an annual admittance rate of 25,000 patients.
- Royal Rehabilitation Center: It is a rehabilitation hospital that was founded in 1983 and has a capacity of 150 beds.
- Queen Alia Heart Institute: It is a specialized hospital that was founded in 1983 and has a capacity of 170 beds.
- Princess Iman Center for Research and Laboratory Sciences: It was established in 2001 as a reference center for laboratory investigations. In 2009, it received first place in the accuracy of test findings for thalassemia diagnosis among 155 global laboratory quality control programs for global laboratory testing.
- Prince Hussein Center for Urology and Organ Transplant: It is a 73-bed specialized hospital that was founded in 2000.
- Queen Rania Pediatric Hospital: It was founded in 2011 and treats various types of pediatric diseases, including cancer.

== Notable patients ==
- Princess Rajwa Al Hussein

== Accreditations ==
- ISO 15189
- Jordan Health Care Accreditation Commission (JHAC)

== See also ==
- King Hussein Cancer Center
- King Abdullah University Hospital
