= Mihrimah Sultan (daughter of Şehzade Ziyaeddin) =

Ottoman princess, daughter of Şehzade Mehmed Ziyaeddin, granddaughter of Mehmed V

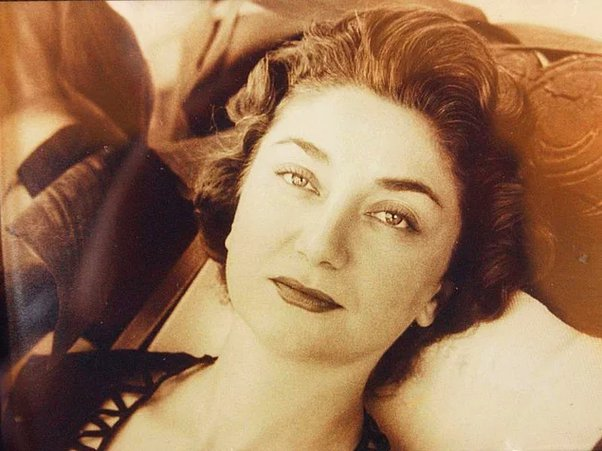
- Born: 14 April 1923; Haydarpasha Villa, Istanbul, Turkey
- Died: 30 March 2000 (aged 76); Amman, Jordan
- Burial: Mehmed V Mausoleum, Eyüp, Istanbul
- Spouse: Prince Nayef bin Abdullah (m. 1940; died 1983)
- Issue: Prince Sultanzade Ali bin Nayef; Prince Sultanzade Abubakr Âsım Nayef
- Dynasty: Ottoman (by birth); Hashemite (by marriage)
- Father: Şehzade Mehmed Ziyaeddin
- Mother: Neşemend Hanım
- Religion: Sunni Islam

Mihrimah Sultan (Ottoman Turkish: مھرماہ سلطان; after marriage Mihrimah Sultan Nayef; 14 April 1923 – 30 March 2000) was an Ottoman princess, the daughter of Şehzade Mehmed Ziyaeddin, son of Mehmed V. She was also a Jordanian princess, as wife of Prince Nayef bin Abdullah, the son of Abdullah I of Jordan, emir of Emirate of Transjordan.

== Early life ==
Mihrimah Sultan was born on 14 April 1923, in her father's villa located at Haydarpasha. Her father was Şehzade Mehmed Ziyaeddin, son of Sultan Mehmed V and Kamures Kadın and her mother was Neşemend Hanım. She was the eighth child and youngest daughter of her father and the only child of her mother. She was the first princess to be born after the dissolution of the Ottoman Empire.

She had green eyes. She lived on the second floor with her mother at her father's villa, which was occupied by her mother after her father divorced his wife Melekseyran Hanım. On 29 October 1923, Turkey was officially declared republic and on 3 March 1924, the Caliphate was abolished and the imperial family was sent to exile. The princess settled at Alexandria, Egypt with her family. She lost her mother when was only twelve in 1934, and her father in 1938, when she was fifteen. She was educated in Paris and in Cairo, and was adorned with charm, nobility, and a mind of her own.

== Marriage ==
In 1940, during the ongoing World War II, Mihrimah married Prince Nayef bin Abdullah of Jordan, youngest son of King Abdullah I of Jordan. The marriage contract was signed on 30 September 1940 and the wedding was held on 7 October 1940 in the villa of Mihrimah's elder half-sister Lütfiye Sultan, which was a wartime scene during the wedding. The wedding was a major national event in Jordan, lasting seven days and seven nights.

The couple moved to Amman, Jordan after the wedding. Her title in Jordan was "Princess Mihrimah Naif" (Arabic: أميرة مهرماه نايف). On 10 August 1941, she gave birth to the couple's first child Prince Ali bin Nayef, he was followed by another son Prince Abubakr Asem bin Nayef, born on 27 April 1948. She was a great deal more independent and free-thinking than most other women of her standing, and unlike other women of the court, who hid their faces behind black veils, she used only a light transparent veil to cover half her face.

After King Abdullah was killed in Jerusalem, his eldest son Talal of Jordan became the king in 1951, and her husband Nayef became heir to the throne. However, King Talal lost his mental balance, was deposed and sent to Istanbul in 1952, where he spent his life in Healing Dormitory in Ortaköy. Prince Nayef was the one who would succeed the throne, however, he rejected and said "I am not interested in politics". After which Talal's elder son Hussein I of Jordan succeeded to the throne. Mihrimah and Prince Nayef resided in Amman, as the senior members of the dynasty.

== Later life and death ==
After her husband's death in 1983, she went on to live in the United States and the United Kingdom for some time and returned to Jordan. She died in Amman on 30 March 2000 at the age of seventy-seven. Her cause of death was blood cancer. Her funeral was attended by the family members living in Turkey. She was buried on 2 April 2000 in the mausoleum of her grandfather in Eyüp, Istanbul.

== Issue ==
By her marriage, Mihrimah Sultan had two sons:

- Prince Sultanzade Ali bin Nâyef (b. 10 August 1941). He married Wijdan Muhana (b. 1939, Baghdad) on 11 April 1966. They have three daughters and a son:
  - Princess Naafa bin Ali (b. 27 December 1966)
  - Princess Rajwa bin Ali (b. 29 June 1968)
  - Princess Basma Fatima bin Ali (b. 24 March 1970)
  - Prince Mohammed Abbas bin Ali (b. 17 February 1973)
- Prince Sultanzade Abubakr Asem bin Nâyef (b. 27 April 1948). He married twice:
  - Firouzeh Vokhshouri. They have three daughters:
    - Princess Yasmin bin Asem (born 30 June 1975), married on 2 September 2005 Basel Yaghnam.
    - Princess Sara bin Asem (born 12 August 1978), married on 26 June 2008 Alejandro Garrido. They have a son and a daughter.
    - Princess Noor bin Asem (born 6 October 1982), married from 29 August 2003 until 9 September 2009 Prince Hamzah bin Hussein. They have a daughter. Married from 22 June 2018 Amr Zedan. They have two sons.
  - Sanaa Kalimat. They have two daughters and a son:
    - Princess Salha bin Asem (born 14 June 1987), married on 4 April 2011 Mohammad Hashim Haj-Hassan. They have a daughter and two sons.
    - Princess Nejla bin Asem (born 9 May 1988), married On 23 October 2014 Nasser Osama Talhouni. They have two children.
    - Prince Nâyef bin Asem (born 22 January 1998), married on 13 April 2021 Sharifa Farah Alluhaymaq.

== Sources ==
- Brookes, Douglas Scott (2010). The Concubine, the Princess, and the Teacher: Voices from the Ottoman Harem. University of Texas Press. ISBN 978-0-292-78335-5.
