= Lütfiye Sultan =

Ottoman Princess

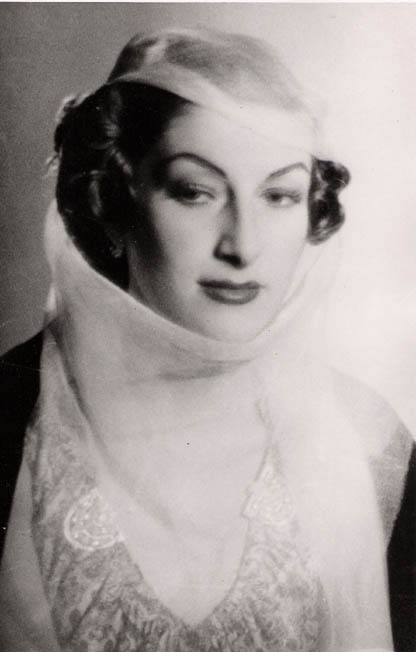
- Born: 20 April 1910; Dolmabahçe Palace, Constantinople, Ottoman Empire (present day Istanbul, Turkey)
- Died: 11 June 1997 (aged 87); Riyadh, Saudi Arabia
- Burial: Mehmed V Mausoleum, Eyüp, Istanbul
- Spouse: Hasan Kemal Bey (m. 1932; died 1958)
- Issue: Sultanzade Ahmed Reşid; Sultanzade Reşad; Perizad Hanımsultan
- Dynasty: Ottoman
- Father: Şehzade Mehmed Ziyaeddin
- Mother: Perizad Hanım
- Religion: Sunni Islam

Lütfiye Sultan (Ottoman Turkish: لطفیه سلطان; 20 April 1910 – 11 June 1997) was an Ottoman princess, the daughter of Şehzade Mehmed Ziyaeddin, son of Mehmed V.

== Early life ==
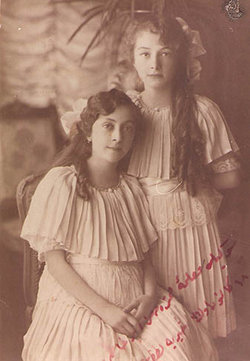
Luftiye Sultan with her sister Hayriye

Lütfiye Sultan was born on 20 April 1910 in the Dolmabahçe Palace. Her father was Şehzade Mehmed Ziyaeddin, and her mother was Perizad Hanım. She was the sixth child, and fifth daughter born to her father and the second child of her mother. She had one full-sister, Hayriye Sultan two years older than her. She was the granddaughter of Sultan Mehmed V and Kamures Kadın.

In 1915, she began her education with her sister. Their teacher was Safiye Ünüvar, who taught them the Quran. According to Ünüvar, she was a beautiful blond haired girl like her sister and mother. Later, during the last years of her grandfather's reign, her parents, her sister and teacher settled in her father's villa in Haydarpasha.

At the exile of the imperial family in March 1924, Lütfiye and her family settled first in Beirut and later in Alexandria, Egypt.

== Marriage ==
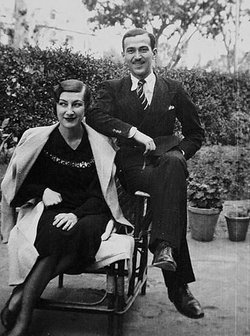
Luftiye Sultan with her husband

Lütfiye married Hasan Kemal Bey on 3 June 1932 in Alexandria, Egypt. A year after the marriage on 7 May 1933 she gave birth to the couple's first child, a son, Sultanzade Ahmed Reşid Bey, who died at the age of twenty five in 1958. A year later on 7 May 1934, she gave birth to the couple's second child, another son, Sultanzade Reşad Bey. The couple's third child and only daughter Perizad Hanımsultan was born on 11 January 1936. The family later settled in Maadi, Cairo.

Lütfiye's husband was referred to among the Ottoman royals as Damat Kemal, a title given to Ottoman Imperial sons-in-law. The couple owned a large handsome villa on Road 10. The villa had been the wartime scene of a historic wedding when her younger sister, Mihrimah Sultan, married Prince Nayef bin Abdullah of Transjordan. Lütfiye was frequently seen driving around Maadi in her latest model American coupé.

She was widowed at Kemal's death in 1958.

== Death ==
Lütfiye died on 11 June 1997 at the age of eighty seven in Riyadh, Saudi Arabia. She was buried in the mausoleum of her grandfather Sultan Mehmed V, located in Eyüp, Istanbul.

== Issue ==
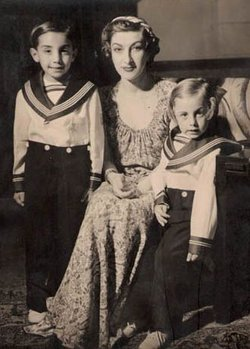
Luftiye Sultan with her children

Name	Birth	Death	Notes
By Hasan Kemal Bey (married 3 June 1932; died 1958)
Sultanzade Ahmed Reşid Bey	7 May 1933	1958	Died unmarried and without issue;
Sultanzade Reşad Bey	7 May 1934	January 2014	Born in Alexandria, Egypt; Died unmarried and without issue;
Perizad Hanımsultan	11 January 1936	living	Married with Cömert Baykent and had issue, a son; Cem Baykent (b. 25 September 1961, Istanbul) who married Nilgün Berna and had a daughter Alara Yasemin Beykent (b. 12 February 1995, Istanbul)

== Ancestry ==
Ancestors of Lütfiye Sultan

8. Abdulmejid I
4. Mehmed V
9. Gülcemal Kadın
2. Şehzade Mehmed Ziyaeddin
5. Kamures Kadın
1. Lütfiye Sultan
3. Perizad Hanım

== Sources ==
- Brookes, Douglas Scott (2010). The Concubine, the Princess, and the Teacher: Voices from the Ottoman Harem. University of Texas Press. ISBN 978-0-292-78335-5.
