= Dürriye Sultan =

Ottoman princess

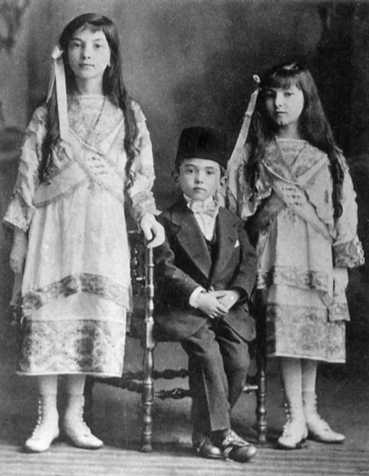
- Dürriye (left) along with her brother Şehzade Mehmed Nazım (centre) and sister Rukiye Sultan (right)
- Born: 3 August 1905; Dolmabahçe Palace, Constantinople, Ottoman Empire
- Died: 15 July 1922 (aged 16); Istanbul, Ottoman Empire
- Burial: Haydarpasha, Istanbul
- Spouse: Sultanzade Mehmed Cahid Osman Bey (m. 1920; div. 1921)
- Dynasty: Ottoman
- Father: Şehzade Mehmed Ziyaeddin
- Mother: Ünsiyar Hanım
- Religion: Sunni Islam

Dürriye Sultan (Ottoman Turkish: دريه سلطان; 3 August 1905 – 15 July 1922) was an Ottoman princess, the daughter of Şehzade Mehmed Ziyaeddin, son of Mehmed V.

== Early life ==
Dürriye Sultan was born on 3 August 1905 in the Dolmabahçe Palace. Her father was Şehzade Mehmed Ziyaeddin and her mother was Ünsiyar Hanım. She was the second child and daughter of her father and the eldest child of her mother. She had a sister, Rukiye Sultan, one year younger than her, and a brother Şehzade Mehmed Nazım, five years younger than her. She was the granddaughter of Sultan Mehmed V and Kamures Kadın.

In 1915, she began her education with her sister and brother. Their teacher was Safiye Ünüvar, who taught them the Quran. In 1918, after the death of her grandfather, she moved to her father's villa located at Haydarpasha, where she occupied the first floor with her mother and sister. After a while her teacher Safiye Ünüvar also came to her apartment to live with her.

== Marriage ==
Dürriye married Sultanzade Mehmed Cahid Osman Bey, son of Naime Sultan, a daughter of Sultan Abdul Hamid II and Bidar Kadın, and Mehmed Kemaleddin Pasha. The marriage took place on 26 March 1920 at the Yıldız Palace, and was performed by Şeyhülislam Haydarîzâde İbrahim Efendi. Her dowry was 1001 purses of gold. After the marriage she moved to Naime Sultan's Palace located on the seashore.

Marriage between her father and Mehmed Cahid's mother had been considered in the past.

In the prenuptial agreement she was given the right to divorce her husband. The two divorced on 6 November 1921 with Şeyhülislam Nuri Efendi's assistance. After the two divorced, her former husband married her maternal aunt Laverans Hanım, with whom he had one son, Bülent Osman Bey.

== Death ==
Dürriye Sultan died of tuberculosis on 15 July 1922, at the age of sixteen, and was buried in Haydarpasha, Istanbul. In the same year, the Ayrılık Fountain was repaired in her memory.

== Honours ==
- Order of the House of Osman

== Sources ==
- Brookes, Douglas Scott (2010). The Concubine, the Princess, and the Teacher: Voices from the Ottoman Harem. University of Texas Press. ISBN 978-0-292-78335-5.
