= Prince Asem bin Nayef =

Jordanian prince

- Born: 27 April 1948 (age 77); Alexandria, Kingdom of Egypt
- Spouse: Firouzeh Vokhshouri (m. 1975; div. 1985) Sana Kalimat (m. 1986)
- Issue: Princess Yasmine; Princess Sara; Princess Noor; Princess Salha; Princess Nejla; Prince Nayef
- House: Hashemite
- Father: Prince Nayef bin Abdullah of Jordan
- Mother: Mihrimah Sultan
- Religion: Islam

Prince Asem bin Nayef (Arabic: الأمير عاصم بن نايف; born 27 April 1948) is the son of Prince Nayef bin Abdullah (a younger son of Abdullah I of Jordan) and Princess Mihrimah Sultan (granddaughter of Sultan Mehmed V of the Ottoman Empire). It is believed he is the 42nd generation direct descendant of Muhammad.

== Education ==
Prince Asem completed his high school education at Millfield School in Somerset, England. He earned his university degree in interior architecture in England of 1972.

== Professional career ==
After university Prince Asem worked for several years in Spain with a leading architectural firm to gain experience. In 1974, he returned to Amman where he started his own architectural business, in addition to importing and exporting furniture and accessories.

Between 1994 and 1996, he taught Interior Design at Petra University. In 1993, he established a security company named Al-Saher for Security. In addition, he established the Jordan Vision Company for Telecommunication. He is the President of both companies.

His hobbies include horse back riding, scuba diving and reading.

=== Activities ===
- Vice President of the Royal Jordanian Equestrian Federation
- President of SPANA (Society for the Protection of Animals Abroad)
- Representative and Agent of several Chinese companies

== Family ==
Prince Asem married Firouzeh Vokhshouri in 1974; they divorced in 1985. They have three daughters:

- Princess Yasmine (born 30 June 1975), married on 2 September 2005 Basel Yaghnam.
- Princess Sara (born 12 August 1978), married on 26 June 2008 Alejandro Garrido. They got divorced on 28 November 2024. Before divorcing, the couple had 3 children:
  - Talal Alejandro Garrido Asem (born January 2009)
  - Lola Garrido Asem (born January 2011)
  - Allegra Garrido Asem (born July 2014)
- Princess Noor (born 6 October 1982), married from 29 August 2003 until 9 September 2009 Prince Hamzah bin Hussein, they had one daughter. On 22 June 2018, Princess Noor married Amr Zedan at King Hussein bin Talal Convention Centre, the couple has two sons.
  - Princess Haya bint Hamzah (born 18 April 2007)
  - Talal Zedan (born 27 March 2019)
  - Abdullah Zedan (born 20 December 2020)

Prince Asem married his current wife, Sana Kalimat, on 6 January 1986. He has three children with her:

- Princess Salha (born 14 June 1987), married on 4 April 2011 Mohammad Hashim Haj-Hassan. The couple has three children:
  - Aisha Haj-Hassan (born 27 May 2013)
  - Hashim Haj-Hassan (born 1 December 2015)
  - Abdullah Haj-Hassan (born 3 September 2018)
- Princess Nejla (born 9 May 1988), married On 23 October 2014 Nasser Osama Talhouni. The couple had three daughters:
  - Karimah Talhouni (born 6 January 2016)
  - Shauna Talhouni (born 10 December 2018)
  - Badiyah Talhouni (born 2 February 2023)
- Prince Nayef (born 22 January 1998), married on 13 April 2021 Sharifa Farah Alluhaymaq. The couple has two sons:
  - Prince Asem bin Nayef (born 13 January 2023)
  - Prince Naser bin Nayef (born 5 May 2025)
