= Rukiye Sultan =

Ottoman princess

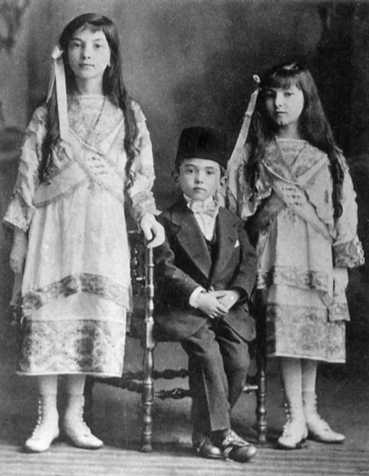
- Rukiye Sultan (right) with her brother Şehzade Mehmed Nazim and her sister Dürriye Sultan
- Born: 11 October 1906; Dolmabahçe Palace, Constantinople, Ottoman Empire (now Istanbul, Turkey)
- Died: 20 February 1927 (aged 20); Budapest, Kingdom of Hungary
- Burial: Budapest, Hungary
- Spouse: Sokolluzade Abdülbaki Ihsan Bey (m. 1924)
- Issue: Behiye Emel Nuricihan Hanımsultan
- Dynasty: Ottoman
- Father: Şehzade Mehmed Ziyaeddin
- Mother: Ünsiyar Hanım
- Religion: Sunni Islam

Rukiye Sultan (Ottoman Turkish: رقيه سلطان; 11 October 1906 – 20 February 1927) was an Ottoman princess, the daughter of Şehzade Mehmed Ziyaeddin, son of Mehmed V.

== Early life ==
Rukiye Sultan was born on 11 October 1906 in the Dolmabahçe Palace. Her father was Şehzade Mehmed Ziyaeddin, son of Sultan Mehmed V and Kamures Kadın, and her mother was Ünsiyar Hanım. She was the third child and daughter of her father and the second child of her mother. She had a sister, Dürriye Sultan, one year older than her, and a brother Şehzade Mehmed Nazım, four years younger than her.

In 1915, she began her education with her sister and brother. Their teacher was Safiye Ünüvar, who taught them the Quran. In 1918, after the death of her grandfather, she moved to her father's villa located at Haydarpasha, she occupied the first floor with her mother and sister.

== Marriage ==
In 1922, the empire was abolished and on 29 October 1923, Turkey was officially declared as a republic, after which the imperial family went into exile in March 1924. Rukiye and her family settled in Beirut, Lebanon. Here she met Abdülbaki Ihsan Bey, a descendant of Sokollu Mehmed Pasha through his son Sultanzade Ibrahim Paşah by Ismihan Sultan (daughter of Sultan Selim II and Nurbanu Sultan). He had taken part in the Turkish War of Independence, and had been stripped off his nationality, and was forbidden from returning to Turkey. The two married in 1924, and their only daughter, Behiye Emel Nuricihan Hanımsultan was born on 15 June 1925. Six months after giving birth, Rukiye became ill. They then went to Budapest, Hungary for treatment.

== Death ==
Rukiye Sultan died on 20 February 1927 at the age of twenty, in Budapest, where she buried in the tomb of 16th-century Ottoman Sufi, Gül Baba.

== Issue ==
Name	Birth	Notes
By Abdülbaki Ihsan Bey (married 1924)
Behiye Emel Nuricihan Hanımsultan	15 June 1925	Born in Beirut, Lebanon; Married with Cemal Hodo (1900-1977) in 1951 and had issue, two daughters, Naime Banu Hodo (b.1952) and Rukiye Bala Hodo (1955-2023) and a son Nazim Hodo (b.1958);

== Ancestry ==
Ancestors of Rukiye Sultan

8. Abdulmejid I
4. Mehmed V
9. Gülcemal Kadın
2. Şehzade Mehmed Ziyaeddin
5. Kamures Kadın
1. Rukiye Sultan
3. Ünsiyar Hanım
7. Firdevs Hanım

== Sources ==
- Brookes, Douglas Scott (2010). The Concubine, the Princess, and the Teacher: Voices from the Ottoman Harem. University of Texas Press. ISBN 978-0-292-78335-5.
