= Firouzeh =

Firouzeh may refer to:

- Firouzeh Vokhshouri, former princess of Jordan
- Firouzeh Palace in Tehran
- Firuzeh, Razavi Khorasan Province, Iran
