= Şehzade Mehmed Ziyaeddin =

Ottoman prince (1873–1938)

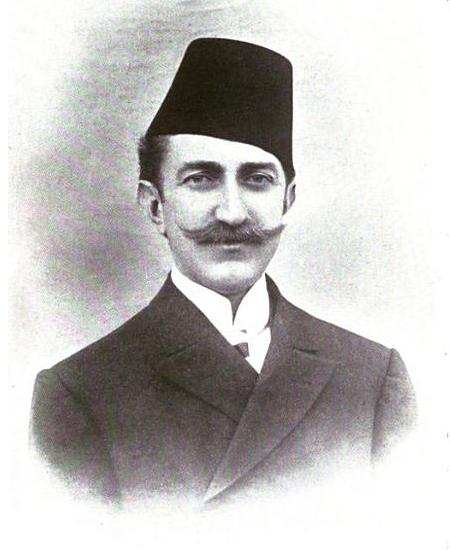
- Portrait, 19th century
- Born: 26 August 1873; Ortaköy Palace, Constantinople, Ottoman Empire (present day Istanbul, Turkey)
- Died: 30 January 1938 (aged 64); Alexandria, Egypt
- Burial: Khedive Tewfik Pasha Mausoleum, Cairo
- Spouse: Perniyan Hanım (m. 1898, divorced) Ünsiyar Hanım (m. 1903; died 1934) Perizad Hanım (m. 1907; died 1934) Melekseyran Hanım (m. 1911, divorced) Neşemend Hanım (m. 1920; died 1934)
- Issue: Behiye Sultan; Dürriye Sultan; Rukiye Sultan; Hayriye Sultan; Lütfiye Sultan; Şehzade Mehmed Nazım; Şehzade Ömer Fevzi; Mihrimah Sultan
- Dynasty: Ottoman
- Father: Mehmed V
- Mother: Kamures Kadın
- Religion: Sunni Islam
- Military career
- Allegiance: Ottoman Empire
- Branch: Ottoman Army
- Service years: 1916–1922 (active service)
- Rank: See list

Şehzade Mehmed Ziyaeddin Efendi (Ottoman Turkish: شهزادہ محمد ضیاالدین; 26 August 1873 – 30 January 1938) was an Ottoman prince, firstborn of Sultan Mehmed V, born by his first consort Kamures Kadın.

== Early life ==
Şehzade Mehmed Ziyaeddin was born on 26 August 1873 in his father's villa in Ortaköy Palace. His father was Mehmed V, son of Abdülmecid I and Gülcemal Kadın, and his mother was Kamures Kadın. When his father became heir to the throne in 1876, following the accession of his elder brother, Sultan Abdülhamid II, the family moved to the apartment of the crown prince located in the Dolmabahçe Palace.

His circumcision took place on 17 December 1883, together with Şehzade Mehmed Selim, eldest son of Sultan Abdülhamid II, Şehzade Ibrahim Tevfik, grandson of Sultan Abdülmecid I, and Abdülmecid II, Şehzade Mehmed Şevket and Şehzade Mehmed Seyfeddin, sons of Sultan Abdülaziz.

== Education and career ==
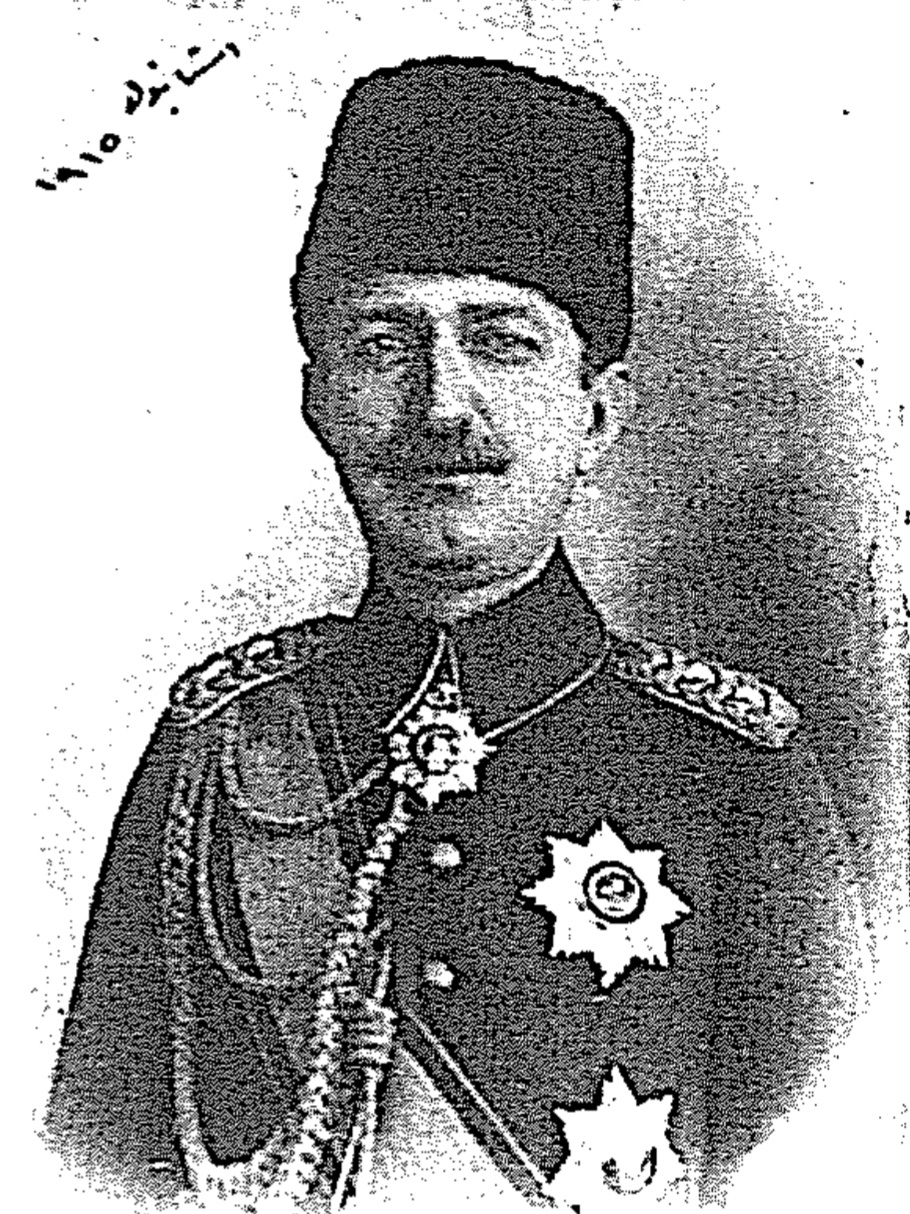
Şehzade Mehmed Ziyaeddin in ceremonial uniform

Between 1911 and 1912, Ziyaeddin attended the Imperial War College. In February 1916, during the First World War he served as honorary Cavalry Brigadier in the Imperial Ottoman Army. He also served as honorary aide-de-camp to his father, Sultan Mehmed V Reşad.

After the death of Sultan Mehmed V Reşad in 1918, Ziyaeddin enrolled in Imperial Medical School. Safiye Ünüvar, tells in her memois that he used to bring his notebooks to her, and she would copy them out cleanly. He also took algebra lessons from her.

== Public life ==
On 2 September 1909, Ziyaeddin travelled to Bursa with his father, Sultan Mehmed V Reşad, and brothers, Şehzade Mahmud Necmeddin and Şehzade Ömer Hilmi. On 13 June 1910, he and his brothers received Şehzade Yusuf Izzeddin at the Sirkeci railway station, when he came from his first visit to Europe. Between 5 and 26 June 1911, Ziyaeddin travelled to Rumelia with his father and brothers.

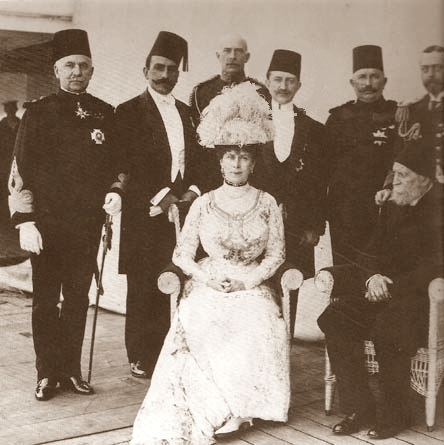
Ziyaeddin (standing third from right) aboard HMS Medina at Port Said in December 1911, during a stopover of the ship bringing King George V and Queen Mary to India for the Delhi Durbar in the course of which George V will be formally proclaimed Emperor of India

On 11 November 1911, he traveled to Egypt to meet the King of the United Kingdom George V, and his wife, Queen Mary of Teck, and stayed there until 29 November 1911. Between 4 and 5 November 1912, during the Balkan Wars, he visited the Çatalca front. Between 10 and 21 April 1917, during the First World War, he visited the German Empire.

On 15 October 1917, he met with the German Emperor Wilhelm II, when the latter visited Istanbul. On 9 May 1918, he also met the Emperor Charles I of Austria, during the latter's visit to Istanbul, with his wife Empress Zita of Bourbon-Parma.

== Personal life ==
When Ziyaeddin came of age, Sultan Abdülhamid II, his father's half-brother, decided that he should marry Abdülhamid's daughter Naime Sultan. The wedding never took place because Ziyaeddin and his father rejected the proposal, but, curiously, a daughter of Ziyaeddin, Dürriye Sultan, married Naime Sultan's son, Sultanzade Mehmed Cahid Osman Bey.

Ziyaeddin's first wife was Perniyan Hanım. She was born on 2 January 1880. They married on 5 January 1898, when she was eighteen. In 1900 she gave birth to Behiye Sultan. She was an accomplished calligrapher. When Sultan Mehmed V Reşad happened to notice a work of hers he showed it to one of the calligraphers of that time, who admired it greatly. She hoped to arrange for lessons in calligraphy through Sabit Bey, Sultan Mehmed V Reşad's Master of the Robes, however, court tradition proved an obstacle to her goals, and she had to remain content with having earned the sultan's admiration for her work. Later divorced, Perniyan died in 1947 at the age of 67.

Ziyaeddin's second wife was Ünsiyar Hanım. She was born in 1887. She was a Circassian. She was the daughter of Hüseyin Bey and Firdevs Hanım. She had one sister, Hacer Laverans Hanım (1900 – 1992). They married on 16 August 1903, when she was sixteen. Some two years later she gave birth to Dürriye Sultan, in 1905, followed by Rukiye Sultan in 1906 and Şehzade Mehmed Nazım in 1910. She was an intelligent and reasonable lady, and took a particular interest in the education of royal women. She died in 1934 in Alexandria, Egypt, aged 47.

Ziyaeddin's third wife was Perizad Hanım. She was born in 1889. A certain Vedat Bey was her paternal cousin. They married on 18 January 1907, when she was seventeen. In 1908 she gave birth to Hayriye Sultan, followed in 1910 by Lütfiye Sultan. She was known in the palace for her good nature and discretion. She died in the French Hospital in Alexandria, Egypt, in 1934, at the age of forty five, and was buried in the mausoleum of Prince Omar Tusun Pasha.

Ziyaeddin's fourth wife was Melekseyran Hanım. She was born on 23 September 1890. She had a sister, Sermelek Hanım. They married in 1911. The following year she gave birth to Şehzade Ömer Fevzi. She was beautiful but hadn't been educated well. Later divorced, she died in 1966 at the age of seventy six.

Ziyaeddin's fifth wife was Neşemend Hanım. They married in 1920, after Ziyaeddin's divorce from Melekseyran. Later in 1923 she gave birth to Mihrimah Sultan. She died in 1934, at aged twenty nine, in Egypt, where she was buried at the city of Helwan.

== Later life and death ==
Following the death of his father, Sultan Mehmed Reşad, Prince Ziyaeddin and his family moved to his villa located at Ibrahim Pasha Meadows, visiting Yıldız Palace and Dolmabahçe Palace only on high holidays and official occasions. The villa included three distinct units, each of three stories, so that each wife and her children could occupy their own quarters. Altogether the entourage of Prince Ziyaeddin and his wives totalled thirty-six persons.

Following the establishment of the Turkish Republic and the abolition of the Ottoman Sultanate and the Ottoman Caliphate, the entire Imperial Ottoman family were forced into exile in March 1924. Ziyaeddin and his family settled in Beirut, Lebanon. In 1926, they went to Alexandria, Egypt. In the years before his death, he sailed on a foreign ship and watched Istanbul from the deck, as he could not enter in Turkey. When he tried to disembark as a common tourist, he was taken back to the ship by the Turkish police. He died at the age of sixty four at Alexandria because of tubercuolosis on 30 January 1938 and was buried in the mausoleum of Khedive Tewfik Pasha in Cairo.

== Personality ==
Ziyaeddin was often seen with his eccentric modes of dress.

He always kept ties with the poorer classes and never refused them assistance in any way, expending a part of his small income to help the needy people of Kadıköy and environs as well as Üsküdar. He paid for the burial of indigent persons, financially assisted penniless girls who were to be married, and requested his consorts to help in providing them clothing and other items. At the beginning of each month he would distribute an allowance to the needy persons in the neighborhood, insofar as he was capable. Among the Kalfa (servants) in his service there was Nevzad Hanim, who would become the last consort of Sultan Mehmed VI, his father's younger half-brother.

== Honours ==
Ottoman honours

- Order of Osmanieh, 1st Class, 1884; Jeweled, 26 March 1912
- Order of the Medjidie, Jeweled, 1909
- Liakat Medal, 17 October 1916
- Order of Glory, Jeweled, 2 May 1917
- Order of the House of Osman
- Hicaz Demiryolu Medal in Gold
- Ottoman War Medal

Foreign honours

- United Kingdom: Knight Grand Cross of the Royal Victorian Order, 21 November 1911
- Serbia: Order of Karađorđe's Star
- Austria-Hungary: Grand-Cross of the Order of Leopold, 6 June 1918

=== Military appointments ===
Honorary military ranks and army appointments

- February 1916: Cavalry Brigadier, Ottoman Army
- Aide-de-Camp to the Sultan

== Issue ==
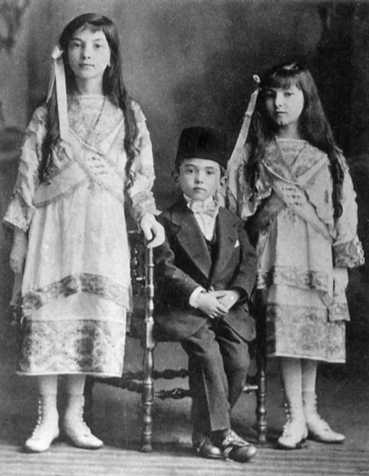
Left to right: Dürriye, Nazim and Rukiye, three of Ziyaeddin's children

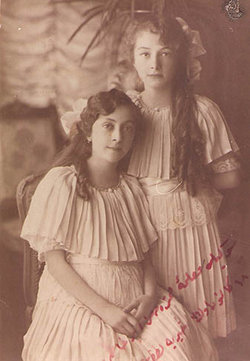
Luftiye and Hayriye, others two Ziyaeddin's daughters

Şehzade Mehmed Ziyaeddin had two sons and six daughters.

=== Sons ===
- Şehzade Mehmed Nazim (22 December 1910 - 11 November 1984) - with Ünsiyar Hanım. Born in Dolmabahçe Palace. He died at Istanbul, Turkey, and buried in tomb of Sultan Mehmed V. He married twice: in 1938 with Perizad Belkis Hanım, which marriage was not recognized by Caliph Abdülmecid II and was annulled in 1944, and with her he had a son, and in 1945 in Cairo with Halime Lima Hanım (16 June 1919 – Cairo, 22 March 2000), granddaughter of Şeyh Ebülhuda Efendi, and with her he had two sons:
  - Şehzade Cengiz (b. 20 November 1939). He married three times, to Eileen Imrie Hanım (b. 1946), and had a daughter and a son:
    - Ayşe Louise Sultan (b. 21 March 1964). Married with Damat William "Bill" Rehm and had two daughters:
      - Peri Kathleen Hanımsultan Rehm (b. 2 June 1994)
      - Zekeriya Hanımsultan Rehm (b. October 1996)
    - Şehzade Mehmed Eric Ziyaeddin (b. 18 April 1966). Married twice, first with a European woman named Kelly Hanım and later with Jackie Marie Hanım, and had two daughters:
      - Donna Sultan
      - Suzanne Sultan
  - Şehzade Hasan Orhan (b. 9 September 1946). He married twice, to Devlet Sue Tolestoa Hanım (b. 27 November 1957), annulated in 1985, and on 9 September 1996 with Malak Seyfallah Ruşdi Hanım (b. 8 July 1960), without issue
  - Şehzade Mehmed Ziyaeddin (b. 17 September 1947). He married twice, on 4 September 1969 with Ghada Habjouga Hanım (b. 1 September 1952), without issue, and on 2 May 1984 with Allison Maddox Hanım (b. 4 December 1951), and had a son and a daughter:
    - Şehzade Nazim (b. 24 September 1985)
    - Nermin Zoé Sultan (b. 30 March 1988)
- Şehzade Ömer Fevzi (13 November 1912 - 24 April 1986) - with Melekseyran Hanım. Born in Yıldız Palace. In 1946 in Cairo he married Mukaddes Hanım. After her death in 1958, he married Veliye Hanım in 1963. He had no children. He died in Amman, Jordan. Buried in the Mehmed V mausoleum.

=== Daughters ===
- Behiye Sultan (Dolmabahçe Palace, Istanbul, 8 November 1900 - Alexandria, Egypt, 1950) - with Perniyan Hanım. Buried in tomb of Khedive Tewfik. She was married three times: in the Dolmabahçe Palace, Istanbul, on 6 April 1916 to Damat Prince Kavalalı Ömer Halim Bey (1898-1954), son of Said Halim Paşah, marriage was annulled on 4 November 1920, without issue, in the Göztepe Palace, Istanbul, in 1921 to Damat Cemâleddîn Bey, a morganatic marriage because it was not recognized by Sultan Mehmed VI, annulled in 1931, and had a son, and on 9 November 1934 to Damat Sertabib Hafız Zeki Bey, and had a son:
  - Sultanzade Reşad Bey (b. 1930). Married a European woman named Jeanne. They had a son and a daughter:
    - Cengiz (b. 1972)
    - Sabrina (b. 1974)
  - Sultanzade Ahmed Reşid Bey (b. 1935). Married Ülfet Fadi (b. 6 February 1936). They had two sons and one daughter:
    - Mahmud Ahmad Raşid (b. 10 August 1958)
    - Mona Ahmad Raşid (b. 10 March 1962)
    - Muhammad Ahmad Raşid (b. 26 November 1966)
- Dürriye Sultan (3 August 1905 - 15 July 1922) - with Ünsiyar Hanım. She married in 1920 Sultanzade Mehmed Cahid Osman Bey, son of Naime Sultan, and divorced after a year, in 1921. She died of tuberculosis the following year.
- Rukiye Sultan (11 October 1906 - 20 February 1927) - with Ünsiyar Hanım. She married in 1924 Damat Sokolluzâde Abdülbâki Ihsân Bey. With him she had one daughter:
  - Behiye Emel Nuricihan Hanımsultan (Beirut, 15 June 1925 - ?), married and had issue
- Hayriye Sultan (Dolmabahçe Palace, Istanbul, 16 February 1908 - Beirut, 5 March 1943) - with Perizad Hanım. Died of tuberculosis. Buried in Tewfik Pasha mausoleum. Unmarried and without issue.
- Lütfiye Sultan (20 April 1910 - 11 June 1997) - with Perizad Hanım. She married in 1932 Damat Hasan Bey. She had two sons and one daughter with him:
  - Sultanzade Ahmed Reşid Bey (7 May 1933 - 1958), unmarried and without issue
  - Sultanzade Reşad Bey (Alexandria, 7 May 1934 - January 2014), unmarried and without issue
  - Perizad Hanımsultan (b. 11 January 1936), married and had issue
- Mihrimah Sultan (14 April 1923 - 30 March 2000) - with Neşemend Hanım. She married Prince Nâyef, one of the sons of King Abdüllah I of Jordan. She had two sons with him:
  - Prince Sultanzade Ali Bey (b. 10 August 1941)
  - Prince Sultanzade Abubakr Âsım Bey (b. 27 April 1948)

== Sources ==
- Alp, Ruhat (2018). Osmanlı Devleti'nde Veliahtlık Kurumu (1908–1922) (PhD Thesis) (in Turkish). Hacettepe University Institute of Social Sciences.
- Brookes, Douglas Scott (2010). The Concubine, the Princess, and the Teacher: Voices from the Ottoman Harem. University of Texas Press. ISBN 978-0-292-78335-5.
- Gün, Fahrettin (2018). Sultan V. Mehmed Reşad ve dönemi - Cilt 3: Sultan Mehmed Reşad'ın Oğlu Şehzade Ziyaeddin Efendi (1873-1938). TBMM Milli Saraylar. ISBN 978-9-752-46418-6.
- Uçan, Lâle (2019). Son Halife Abdülmecid Efendi'nin Hayatı - Şehzâlik, Veliahtlık ve Halifelik Yılları (PDF) (PhD Thesis). Istanbul University Institute of Social Sciences.
