= Princess Sara bint Asem =

Jordanian royal family member

Princess Sara
- Born: 12 August 1978 (age 47); Amman, Jordan
- Spouse: Alejandro Garrido (m. 2008; div. 2024)
- Issue: Talal Garrido Asem; Lola Garrido Asem; Allegra Garrido Asem
- House: Hashemite
- Father: Prince Asem bin Nayef
- Mother: Firouzeh Vokhshouri

Princess Sara bint Asem (born 12 August 1978 in Amman) is a member of the Jordanian Royal Family as the daughter of Prince Asem bin Nayef and Firouzeh Vokhshouri. Her parents divorced in 1985 and in 1986 her father remarried Princess Sana Asem. Princess Sara was raised in Madrid, where she lives with her family.

== Marriage and children ==
On 26 June 2008, Princess Sara married a Spanish businessman named Alejandro Garrido at her father's, Prince Asem bin Nayef, house in Amman, through a Nikah ceremony. The reception was held at Prince Asem's palace in Aqaba, on the Red Sea coast.

They have had three children:

- Talal Alejandro Garrido Asem (born January 2009 in Spain)
- Lola Garrido Asem (born January 2011 in Spain).
- Allegra Garrido Asem (born July 2014 in Spain).

Princess Sara and Alejandro separated in August 2021 and signed the divorce in November 2024.

== Family ==
Princess Sara was divorced on November 28, 2024.

=== Siblings ===
- Princess Yasmine (born 30 June 1975)
- Princess Noor (born 6 October 1982)

=== Half-siblings ===
- Princess Salha (born 14 June 1987)
- Princess Nejla (born 9 May 1988)
- Prince Nayef (born 22 January 1998)
