= Princess Nejla bint Asem =

Jordanian princess

- Born: 9 May 1988 (age 38)
- Spouse: Nasser Osama Talhouni (m. 2014)
- Issue: Karimah Talhouni; Shauna Talhouni; Badiya Talhouni
- House: Hashemite
- Father: Prince Asem bin Nayef
- Mother: Sana Kalimat

Princess Nejla bint Asem (born 9 May 1988) is the daughter of Prince Asem bin Nayef and Princess Sana Asem. Princess Nejla bint Asem established a business as a jewellery designer.

== Siblings ==
=== Siblings ===
- Prince Nayef ben Asem (born 22 January 1998)
- Princess Salha bint Asem (born 14 June 1987)

=== Half-Siblings ===
- Princess Yasmeen bint Asem (born 30 June 1975)
- Princess Sara bint Asem (born 12 August 1978)
- Princess Nour bint Asem (born 6 October 1982)

== Marriage ==
On 23 October 2014 Princess Nejla married Nasser Osama Talhouni. She has 3 daughters, Karimah, Shauna and Badiya.
