= Princess Salha bint Asem =

Jordanian princess

Princess Salha
- Born: 14 June 1987 (age 37); Amman, Jordan
- Spouse: Mohammad Hashim Haj-Hassan (m. 2011)
- Issue: Aisha Haj-Hassan; Hashim Haj-Hassan; Abdullah Haj-Hassan
- House: Hashemite
- Father: Prince Asem bin Nayef
- Mother: Sana Kalimat

Princess Salha bint Asem (born 14 June 1987 in Amman) is the daughter of Prince Asem bin Al Nayef and Princess Sana Asem.

== Siblings ==
=== Siblings ===
- Prince Nayef ben Asem (born 22 January 1998)
- Princess Nejla bint Asem (born 9 May 1988)

=== Half-Siblings ===
- Princess Yasmeen bint Asem (born 30 June 1975)
- Princess Sara bint Asem (born 12 August 1978)
- Princess Nour bint Asem (born 6 October 1982)

== Marriage ==
On 4 April 2011, Princess Salha married the Jordanian Mohammad Hashim Haj-Hassan at her father's house. The couple have a girl named Aisha (born 27 May 2013) and two boys named Hashim (born 1 December 2015) and Abdullah (born 3 September 2018).
