= Nevzad Hanım =

Consort of Ottoman Sultan Mehmed VI

- Born: Nimet Bargu; 2 March 1902; Hüseyin Bey Mansion, Vişnezade, Beşiktaş, Istanbul, Ottoman Empire
- Died: 23 June 1992 (aged 90); Göksu, Istanbul, Turkey
- Burial: Karacaahmet Cemetery
- Spouse: Mehmed VI (m. 1921; died 1926) Ziya Seferoğlu (m. 1928)
- Issue: Second marriage Fülan Seferoğlu; Fülane Seferoğlu
Names
- Turkish: Nimet Nevzad Hanım; Ottoman Turkish: نمت نوزاد خانم
- House: Bargu (by birth); Ottoman (by marriage)
- Father: Şaban Efendi
- Mother: Hatice Hanım
- Religion: Sunni Islam

Nevzad Hanım (Ottoman Turkish: نمت نوزاد خانم; "young heroine"; born Nimet Bargu and previously Nevzad Kalfa, also known as Nejat after 1928 Nimet Seferoğlu; 2 March 1902 – 23 June 1992) was the fifth and last consort of Sultan Mehmed VI of the Ottoman Empire. She was the last woman to marry an Ottoman sultan.

== Early life ==
Nevzad Hanım was born on 2 March 1902 in Istanbul and was of Albanian origin. However Nihal Atsız, in a letter he wrote to M. Çağatay Uluçay, stated that this lady was of Turkish origin and had been raised in the imperial palace. Born as Nimet Bargu, she was the daughter of Şaban Efendi, a palace gardener, and his wife Hatice Hanım. She had a sister, Nesrin Hanım, two years younger than her, and a brother, Salih Bey. Hüseyin Bey, who was the husband of her paternal aunt, presented Nimet and her sister Nesrin in the imperial harem, where according to the custom of the Ottoman court her name was changed to Nevzad. She was then sent to the harem of Şehzade Mehmed Ziyaeddin, where she served as Kalfa in the entourage of Safiye Ünüvar's student princesses and had taken the same classes and training as they. She was educated by a woman named Ceylanyar Hanım. After Mehmed Vahdeddin's accession to the throne in 1918, she became one of the kalfas and went over to his palace.

== First marriage ==
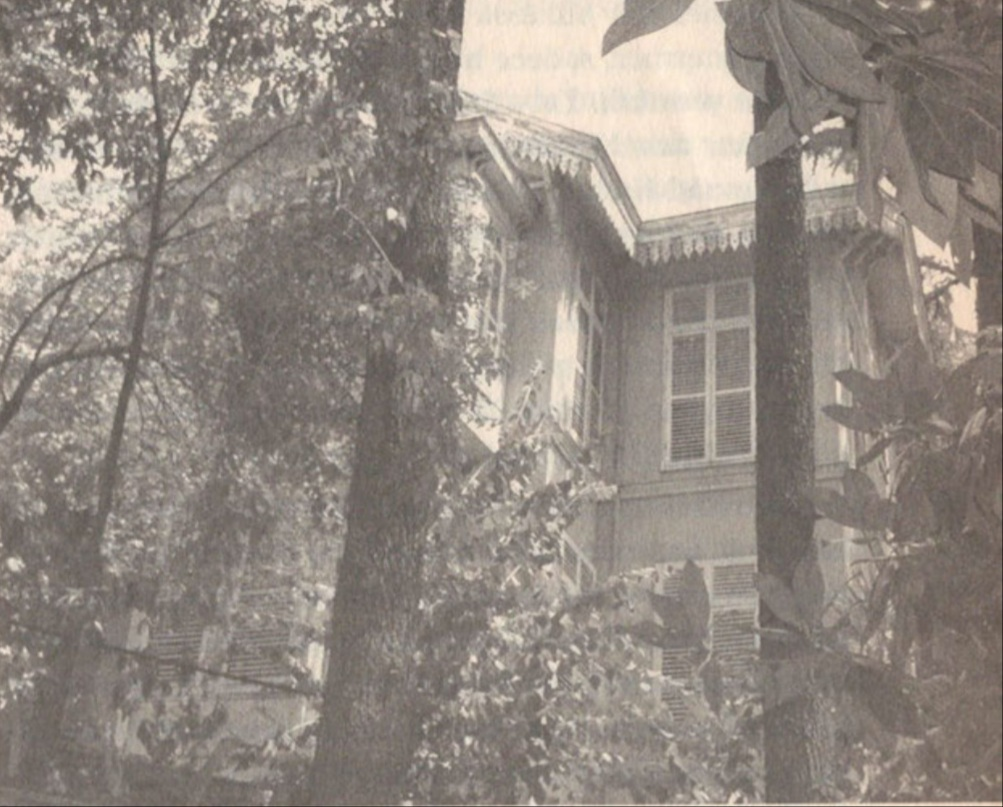
Mansion of Nevzad Hanım located at the Yıldız Palace

Mehmed married Nevzad on 1 September 1921 in the Yıldız Palace. She was the last woman to marry an Ottoman sultan. She was given the title of "Second Ikbal", although, as fourth consort, she should have had the title of Fourth Kadın. Mehmed was sixty-one while Nevzad was nineteen years old. The act of marrying her exacerbated the already frosty, and resentful relations between the children of later Sultan Mehmed V Reşad, and Mehmed VI's own family. Furthermore, Mehmed was so smitten by his new young consort as to be causing gossip in the capital due to his refusal to leave the harem and so part from her company.

Nevzad remained childless. She had a villa on the grounds of the Yıldız Palace. Her sister Nesrin, who had been renamed Sadiru, became senior lady-in-waiting to her. When Mehmed was deposed in 1922, she and other members of his family were imprisoned in the Feriye Palace, but managed to sneak out disguised as Kalfa. When the imperial family went to exile in March 1924, she stayed in Istanbul. On Mehmed's persisted requests, she and her sister Nesrin joined the deposed Sultan in San Remo, in May 1924.

Nevzad was with Mehmed at the time of his death on 15 May 1926. Sultanzade Sami Bey, son of the sultan's sister Mediha Sultan confronted Nevzad, and attracted attention to the possibility of his uncle's having been murdered. Sami Bey, doubted that Nevzad was involved in his death. He interrogated her, and then sealed her personal property after the sultan's cupboards. Soon after Mehmed's death, Nevzad returned to Istanbul with her sister.

== Second marriage ==
In 1928 she married captain Ziya Bey Seferoğlu, and took the name Nimet Seferoğlu. With him, she had a son and a daughter.

== Memoirs ==
In 1937, Nevzad published her memoirs under the title Yıldız'dan San Remo'ya. The memoirs were published in the Tan newspaper, and noteworthy information about Sultan Mehmed VI was gained. However, serious discussions were made about the memoir's reliability at that period. Apart from the release of the memoirs in 1937, Nevzad refused to talk about the sultan. In 1974, a journalist asked her what life had been like with Sultan Mehmed VI Vahideddin, and she replied: “I buried that time in the depths of my heart”.

== Death ==
Nevzad Hanım died at the age of ninety, on 23 June 1992 in her mansion in Göksu, Istanbul.

== Issue ==
Nevzad Hanım had no child by Mehmed VI, but she had a son and a daughter by her second marriage.

== Honour ==
- Order of Charity, 1st Class, 4 September 1921

== See also ==
- Ikbal (title)
- Ottoman Imperial Harem
- List of consorts of the Ottoman sultans

== Sources ==
- Açba, Leyla (2004). Bir Çerkes prensesinin harem hatıraları. L & M. ISBN 978-9-756-49131-7.
- Brookes, Douglas Scott (2010). The Concubine, the Princess, and the Teacher: Voices from the Ottoman Harem. University of Texas Press. ISBN 978-0-292-78335-5.
- Sakaoğlu, Necdet (2008). Bu mülkün kadın sultanları: Vâlide sultanlar, hâtunlar, hasekiler, kadınefendiler, sultanefendiler. Oğlak Yayıncılık. ISBN 978-9-753-29623-6.
- Uluçay, Mustafa Çağatay (2011). Padişahların kadınları ve kızları. Ankara: Ötüken. ISBN 978-9-754-37840-5.
- Yanatma, Servet (2007). The Deaths and Funeral Ceremonies of Ottoman Sultans (From Sultan Mahmud II TO Sultan Mehmed VI Vahideddin). Boğaziçi University.
