= Order of the Two Rivers =

Order awarded by Iraqi heads of state

Order of the Two Rivers (Wisam Al Rafidain)
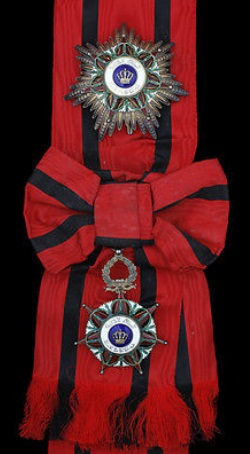

Awarded by Kings of Iraq, Presidents of Iraq
- Type: Order
- Motto: Justice is the Foundation of the State
- Eligibility: Iraqi nationals or anyone who provides service to Iraq
- Awarded for: A national order of chivalry
- Status: Discontinued
- Grades: 1st Class (Grand Cross); 2nd Class; 3rd Class; 4th Class; 5th Class
- Ribbon bar of the order (military division) Ribbon bar of the order (civil division)

The Order of the Two Rivers (Arabic: وسام الرافدين Wisam Al Rafidain) was an Order awarded by the Kings of Iraq and then the Presidents of Iraq.

== History ==
It was named after the two rivers, the Euphrates and Tigris, that flow through the middle of the country. It was initially awarded by the kings of Iraq between 1922 when the monarchy was established, and 1958 when the monarchy ended. It was continued by the presidents of Iraq through the 1960s, 1970s, and 1980s.

== Classes ==
It had five classes and two divisions (military and civil).

== Recipients ==
- Ali of Hejaz
- Abdul Salam Arif
- Abdul Rahman Arif
- Ahmed Hassan al-Bakr
- George VI
- Gustaf VI Adolf
- Faisal of Saudi Arabia
- Francis Humphrys
- Hussein of Jordan
- Hussein Rashid
- Henryk Jabłoński
- Mohammad Reza Pahlavi
- Salman bin Hamad Al Khalifa I
- Saddam Hussein
- David Luce
- Josip Broz Tito
- Hugh Trenchard, 1st Viscount Trenchard
- Nayef bin Abdullah
- Arthur Young
- Squadron Leader Henry Edward Forrow OBE RAF (4th Class, for valuable services to the Iraqi Government, 23 November 1937)
- Umm Kulthum

== See also ==
- Order of the Nile
