= Firouzeh Vokhshouri =

Jordanian diplomat and former member of the Jordanian royal family

- Occupation: Diplomat
- Spouse: Prince Asem bin Nayef (m. 1974; div. 1985)
- Children: Princess Yasmine bint Asem; Princess Sara bint Asem; Princess Noor bint Asem
- Father: Hamid Vokhshouri

Firouzeh Vokhshouri is a Jordanian diplomat and former member of the Jordanian royal family. She was married to Prince Asem bin Nayef from 1974 to 1985.

== Career ==
Vokhshouri has been an attaché at the Jordanian Embassy in Madrid since 1992.
