= Prince Nayef bin Abdullah =

Son of King Abdullah I of Jordan (1914–1983)

Prince Nayef bin Abdullah الأمير نايف بن عبدالله
- Regent of Jordan
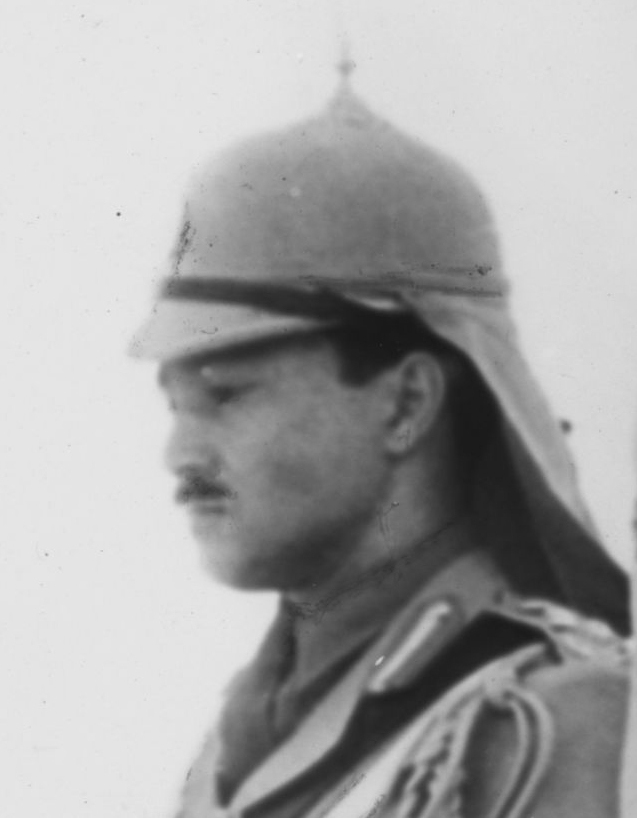
- Prince Nayef at the coronation of his father, King Abdullah I, Amman, 1946
- Born: 14 November 1914; Ta'if, Kingdom of Hejaz
- Died: 12 October 1983 (aged 68); Amman, Jordan
- Burial: Royal Mausoleum, Raghadan Palace
- Spouse: Mihrimah Sultan (m. 1940)
- Issue: Prince Ali bin Nayef; Prince Asem bin Nayef
Names
- Nayef bin Abdullah bin Hussein bin Ali نايف بن عبدالله بن الحسين بن علي
- House: Hashemite
- Father: Abdullah I of Jordan
- Mother: Suzdil Khanum
- Religion: Islam

Prince Nayef bin Abdullah (Arabic: الأمير نايف بن عبدالله, al-Amir Nayif ibn ʿAbd Allāh; 14 November 1914 – 12 October 1983) was the younger son of King Abdullah I of Jordan, by his second wife, Suzdil Khanum. As a member of the Hashemite dynasty, the royal family of Jordan since 1921, Nayef was a 39th-generation direct descendant of Muhammad.

Nayef attended Victoria College in Alexandria. He underwent military training in Turkey, being assigned as the honorary Aide-de-Camp of the Turkish President Ismet Inönü from April 1939 until shortly before the outbreak of World War II in September the same year. He became regent of Jordan on 20 July 1951, following the assassination of Abdullah, because his older half-brother King Talal was reportedly suffering from poor health. Nayef ruled in his brother's stead until 6 September 1951, when Talal was judged fit to assume his royal duties. Nayef died in Jordan on 12 October 1983.

== Honours ==
- Knight Grand Cordon (Special Class) of the Supreme Order of the Renaissance (Kingdom of Jordan).
- Knight Grand Cordon of the Order of Independence (Kingdom of Jordan).
- Knight Grand Cordon of the Order of the Star of Jordan (Kingdom of Jordan).
- Knight Grand Cross of the Order of Civil Merit (Spain, 5 September 1949).
- Knight Grand Cross of the Order of Military Merit (with white distinctive) (Spain, 6 September 1949).
- Knight Grand Cross (Special Class) of the Order of the Two Rivers (Kingdom of Iraq).

== Ancestry ==
Ancestors of Prince Nayef bin Abdullah

16. Amir Muhammad III bin Abdul Muin al-Aun, Grand Sharif and Amir of Mecca (= 20)
8. Ali Bey, Sharif of Mecca (= 12)
4. Hussein bin Ali, Sharif of Mecca
18. Gharam al-Shahar
9. Shaikha Salha bint Gharam al-Shahar
2. Abdullah I of Jordan
20. Amir Muhammad III bin Abdul Muin al-Aun, Grand Sharif and Amir of Mecca (= 16)
10. Abdullah Kamil Pasha, Grand Sharif of Mecca
5. Abdiya bint Abdullah
11. Bazmi Jahan
1. Naif bin Al-Abdullah
6. Ali
3. Suzdil Khanum
