= University of Petra =

Private university in Amman, Jordan

Coordinates: 31°53′36″N 35°52′23″E

- Type: Private
- Established: 1991; 35 years ago
- Affiliations: IAU, FUIW
- Chairman: Ghazi Al-Zaben
- President: Ali Abu Ghanimeh
- Faculty: 287
- Administrative staff: 401
- Students: +7000
- Undergraduates: +7000
- Postgraduates: +300
- Location: Amman, Jordan
- Website: www.uop.edu.jo

The University of Petra is a private university located in Amman, Jordan. It grants bachelor's and master's degrees. The university includes students from over 35 nationalities from Arab and foreign countries. The university is located on the airport road and has a green campus and modern university facilities.

== About the University ==
The university was established in 1991, with its first class graduating in 1994. Initially named the "Jordan University for Girls," it was exclusively for female students. In 1999, the name was changed to the University of Petra when the university adopted a policy allowing male students to enroll.
The University has approximately 7,000 undergraduate and graduate students. The university comprises the following faculties:

- Faculty of Dentistry
- Faculty of Arts and Sciences
- Faculty of Administrative and Financial Sciences
- Faculty of Pharmacy and Medical Sciences
- Faculty of Information Technology
- Faculty of Architecture and Design
- Faculty of Law
- Faculty of Mass Communication
- Faculty of Engineering

== Green sustainability ==
The main elements of the University of Petra's sustainability strategy are:

- Better health
- Energy efficiency
- Clean energy
- Water efficiency and reuse
- Transportation
- Built environment and infrastructure
- Waste reduction and proper handling
- Education and research
- Social development
- Partnership for the Environment

== Academic staff profile ==
The University of Petra has approximately 287 teaching staff members, primarily Jordanians, with some international lecturers from various countries.

== Numbers of students per year ==
The university annually includes more than 7,000 students, who are distributed across its various faculties.

== Students profile ==
Students are assisted in adapting to university life and culture by the Deanship of Student Affairs (DSA) and their academic advisors. The University of Petra provides transportation services for students for a nominal fee.

== International students ==
The university hosts over 1,265 international students from various countries, contributing to its diverse academic community.

== Accreditations ==
- The first Jordanian university to receive quality assurance accreditation from the Jordanian Higher Education Accreditation Commission.
- Accredited by ABET in Computer Information Systems and Computer Science.
- ISO 2015:9001 certified by TÜV Austria.
- British accreditation (ASIC) in English Language and Literature.
- British accreditation (ASIC) at the university level as a distinguished university with high distinction in all fields.
- Accredited by ACPE in Pharmacy.
- Recipient of the Al-Hasan Award for Scientific Excellence.
- European German accreditation (ASIIN) in Chemistry.
- Canadian accreditation (IIMP) for Marketing.
- Quality assurance certification in faculties (Pharmacy and Medical Sciences, Mass Media, Architecture and Design).
- British international accreditation by IET in Software Engineering.
- British accreditation by the IOA in Business Intelligence and Data Analysis.
- American international accreditation "ABET" in Civil Engineering.

== Membership ==
A university accredited both generally and specifically by the Ministry of Higher Education and Scientific Research, and a member of:

- Association of Arab Universities
- International Association of Universities
- Federation of the Universities of the Islamic World
- Association of Islamic Universities
- Association of Arab Private Institutions for Higher Education

== Faculties and majors/specialties of the University ==
The University Includes nine faculties.

=== Bachelor's Degree programs ===
Faculty of Arts and Sciences: Includes majors in Arabic Language and Literature, English Language & Literature, English Language and Translation, Applied English, French Language, Early Childhood Education, Class Teacher, Chemistry, Mathematics, Physical Education.

Faculty of Mass Communication: Includes Journalism and Digital Media, Public Relations and Digital Promotion, Radio and Television.

Faculty of Pharmacy and Medical Sciences: Includes Pharmacy, Medical Analysis, Clinical Nutrition and Dietetics.

Faculty of Information Technology: Includes Software Engineering, Computer Science, Data Science and Artificial Intelligence, Virtual and Augmented Reality, Information Security.

Faculty of Architecture and Design: Includes Architecture, Graphic Design, Interior Design, Animation and Multimedia, Digital Film Design Technology.

Faculty of Administrative and Financial Sciences: Includes Business Administration, Banking and Finance, Digital Marketing, Accounting, E-Business and Commerce, Business Intelligence and Data Analysis, Financial Technology, Supply Chains Management and Logistics Sciences.

Faculty of Law: Includes Law.

Faculty of Engineering: Civil Engineering.

Faculty of Dentistry: Doctor in Dentistry and Oral Surgery, Dental Manufacturing Technology.

=== Master's Degree programs ===
Petra University offers Master's programs in the following specializations:

Pharmaceutical Sciences
Food and Nutrition
English Language and Translation
Arabic Language and Literature
Chemistry
Mathematics
Curricula & E-Learning
Interior Design
Sustainable Smart Cities
Journalism and Digital Media
Business Administration
Digital Marketing
Business Intelligence
Engineering Project Management
Laws

== Statistics ==
The number of graduates from 2002/2003 until the end of the summer semester 2022/2023 is as follows:

- 2002/2003: 436
- 2003/2004: 632
- 2004/2005: 657
- 2005/2006: 772
- 2007/2008: 1144
- 2008/2009: 1086
- 2009/2010: 1078
- 2010/2011: 1061
- 2011/2012: 1162
- 2012/2013: 1204
- 2013/2014: 1266
- 2014/2015: 1310
- 2015/2016: 1436
- 2016/2017: 1615
- 2017/2018: 1434
- 2018/2019: 1487
- 2019/2020: 1608
- 2020/2021: 1806
- 2021/2022: 1966
- 2022/2023: 1574

== Research ==
The Deanship of Graduate Studies and Research is the center of research activities at the University of Petra. It consists of two councils: one for research activities and another for graduate programs. In accordance with accreditation criteria stipulated by the Ministry of Higher Education and Scientific Research, 5% of the university's budget is allocated to support research activities.
The University of Petra places significant emphasis on scientific research and graduate studies, considering them fundamental to its academic mission. The Deanship of Graduate Studies and Research is responsible for overseeing and managing these activities.
