= Kamures Kadın =

Consort of Sultan Mehmed V (1855–1921)

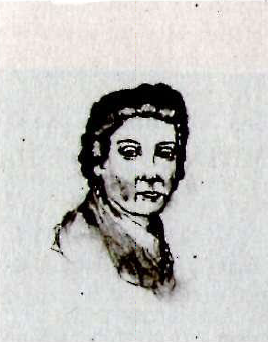

Baş Kadın of the Ottoman Empire (Chief Consort)
- Tenure: 27 April 1909 - 3 July 1918
- Predecessor: Bedrifelek Kadın
- Successor: Emine Nazikeda Kadın
- Born: 5 March 1855; Ganja, Caucasus Viceroyalty, Russian Empire (possibly)
- Died: 30 April 1921 (aged 66); Şehzade Mahmud Necmeddin Palace, Kuruçeşme, Constantinople, Ottoman Empire (present day Istanbul, Turkey)
- Burial: Mehmed V Mausoleum, Eyüp, Istanbul
- Spouse: Mehmed V (m. 1872; died 1918)
- Issue: Şehzade Mehmed Ziyaeddin
Names
- Turkish: Kamures Kadın; Ottoman Turkish: کامرس قادین
- Religion: Sunni Islam

Kamures Kadın (Ottoman Turkish: کامرس قادین; meaning "Bringer of pleasure"; called also Gamres, Kamres or Kamus Kadın; 5 March 1855 – 30 April 1921) was the first and chief consort of Sultan Mehmed V of the Ottoman Empire.

== Early years ==
Kamures Kadın was born on 5 March 1855. According to Palace documents she was born in Ganja, although there are doubts about that. She was sent to the Ottoman court when she was very young as a slave, which was the traditional custom. She received an excellent education and became an outstanding pianist.

She married the then-Prince Mehmed Reşad on 30 September 1872. She was his first consort. A year after the marriage, on 26 August 1873, she gave birth to her only son, Şehzade Mehmed Ziyaeddin.

== Reign of Mehmed V ==
On 27 April 1909, after Mehmed's accession to the throne, she was given the title of "Senior Kadın".

In 1914, she met with Sultan Jahan, Begum of Bhopal. Sultan Mehmed, who knew Persian well, acted as interpreter between the two. Safiye Ünüvar, a teacher at the Palace School, commented in her memoirs about her beauty, and said that she still had some of her looks, when the two met in 1915. Kamures had occupied herself with reading history, and whenever Safiye visited her she would always bring up the subject of Ottoman history.

In 1918, she met with the king Boris III of Bulgaria, when he visited Istanbul. She was presented as Queen of the Ottoman Empire. This was significant, since meeting a man meant that she broke the traditional harem seclusion. On 30 May 1918, Kamures met with the Empress Zita of Bourbon-Parma in the harem of Yıldız Palace, when the latter visited Istanbul with her husband Emperor Charles I of Austria.

== Philanthropy ==
On 20 March 1912, the "Hilal-i Ahmer Centre for Women" was organised within the "Ottoman Hilal-i Ahmer Association", a foundation established in 1877 to provide medical care in Istanbul and surrounding communities. Kamures served as the honorary president of this organization. The same year, she also received the Ottoman Red Crescent Medal (Osmanlı Hilal-i Ahmer Madalyası), which was created shortly after the start of the Balkan Wars in November 1912. The award was given to those who would render beneficent services, materially or morally, to the organisation. She was the only Ottoman Muslim woman before the First World War to have received the medal in gold.

In February 1914, the organisation announced the start of a course for nursing aids, which would consist of eighteen lessons of two hours each on Fridays and Sundays. The classes were to be taught by Besim Ömer and Akıl Muhtar. Between 40 and 50 women participated in the course and at the end of the five months course 27 women successfully took the exam. These 27 women, who were all wives and daughters of prominent Ottoman officials, received their certificate during a ceremony in the presence of Kamures, of Naciye Sultan and her mother and other palace women.

In April 1913, Kamures served as the patroness of the organization Osmanlı–Türk Hanımları Esirgeme Derneği (Association for the Protection of Ottoman Turkish Women). The sultan donated 50 Ottoman pounds to the organization.

== Death ==
After Mehmed's death on 3 July 1918, she settled in the palace of her stepson Şehzade Mahmud Necmeddin in Kuruçeşme, where she died on 30 April 1921, at the age of sixty-six. She was buried in the mausoleum of her husband located in the Eyüp Cemetery, Istanbul.

== Honours ==
- Ottoman Red Crescent Medal in Gold, 1912

=== Appointments ===
- Honorary President of the Hilal-i Ahmer Centre for Women, 20 March 1912

== Issue ==
Name	Birth	Death	Notes
Şehzade Mehmed Ziyaeddin	26 August 1873	30 January 1938	married five times, and had issue, two sons and six daughters

== See also ==
- Kadın (title)
- Ottoman Imperial Harem
- List of consorts of the Ottoman sultans

== Sources ==
- Brookes, Douglas Scott (2010). The Concubine, the Princess, and the Teacher: Voices from the Ottoman Harem. University of Texas Press. ISBN 978-0-292-78335-5.
- Os, Nicolina Anna Norberta Maria van (31 October 2013). Feminism, Philanthropy and Patriotism: Female Associational Life in the Ottoman Empire. Leiden University Institute for Area Studies (LIAS), Faculty of Humanities, Leiden University.
- Sakaoğlu, Necdet (2008). Bu mülkün kadın sultanları: Vâlide sultanlar, hâtunlar, hasekiler, kadınefendiler, sultanefendiler. Oğlak Yayıncılık. ISBN 978-9-753-29623-6.
- Uluçay, Mustafa Çağatay (2011). Padişahların kadınları ve kızları. Ankara: Ötüken. ISBN 978-9-754-37840-5.
