= Amr Zedan =

Saudi Arabian businessman and Thoroughbred horse breeder,

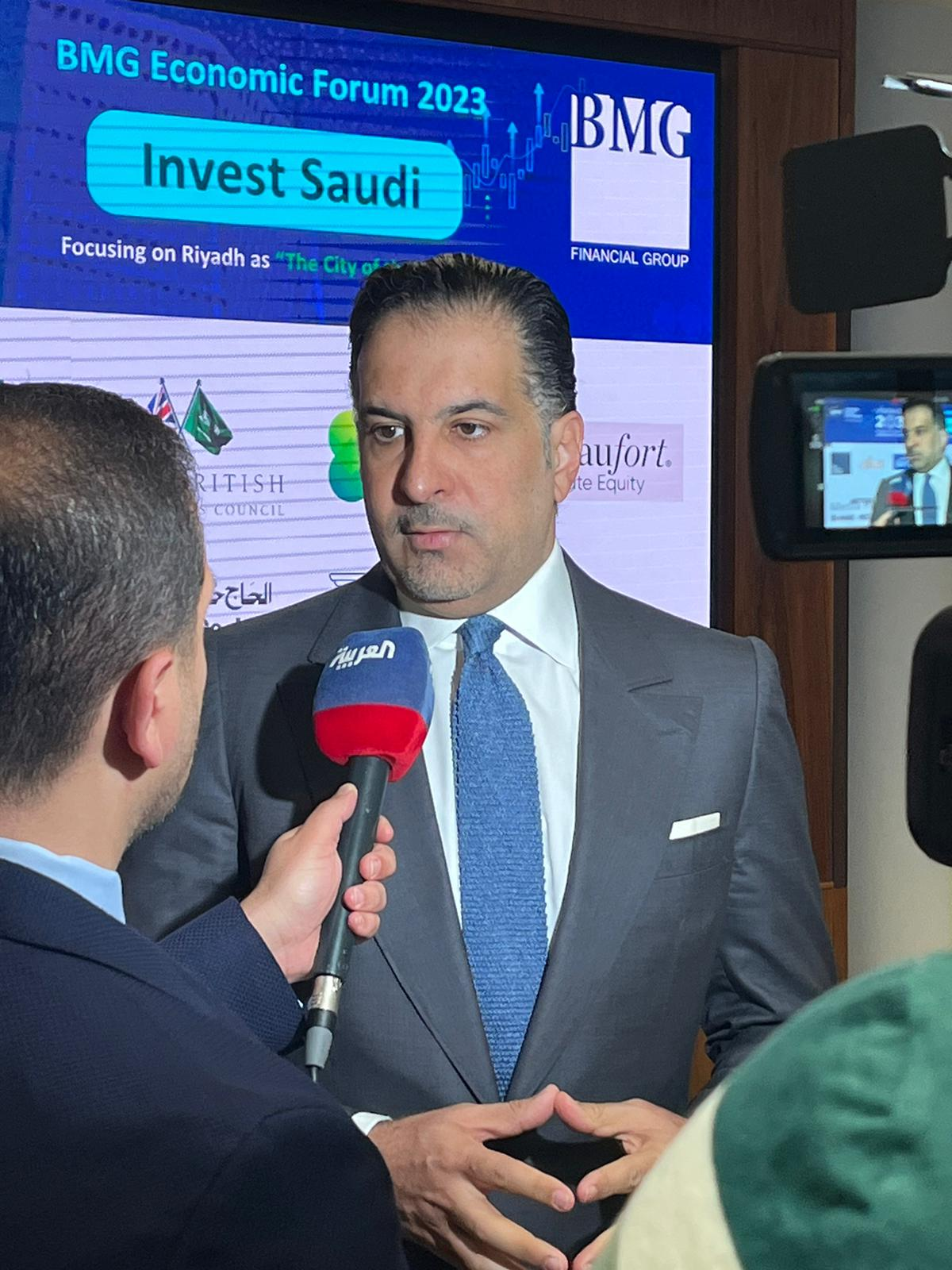
Amr Zedan at BMG Economic Forum, 2023

Amr Zedan (Arabic: عمرو زيدان; born 17 September 1974) is an American-born Saudi businessman, who is Chairman of the Saudi Polo Federation and a member of the board of directors of the Saudi Equestrian Authority.

== Education ==
Zedan obtained a Bachelor of Science degree in industrial engineering management with a minor in electrical/digital engineering from the University of the Pacific, Stockton, California. Previously, he attended Texas A&M University.

== Career ==
He is Chairman of the Saudi Polo Federation and a member of the board of directors of the Saudi Equestrian Authority. He is also Chairman of his family business the Zedan Group, a Saudi engineering conglomerate headquartered in Khobar as well as ZedanMorgan Capital.

His Zedan Racing Stables owned Medina Spirit, who crossed the finish line first in the 2021 Kentucky Derby. However, the horse tested positive for betamethasone after the race (and in a split sample test), which is prohibited at any level on race day. The Kentucky Horse Racing Commission made the final decision to disqualify the horse on February 21, 2022. Medina Spirit died on December 6, 2021 during a workout at Santa Anita of an apparent heart attack. A necropsy examining the sudden death was inconclusive. Medina Spirit's ashes are interred at Old Friends's Nikki Bacharach Memorial Garden in Georgetown, Kentucky. Medina Spirit was named for Zedan's home city of Medina.

Zedan is an avid polo player, and Patron of Zedan Polo team.

In 2022, his net worth was $1.2 billion.

== Personal life ==
Zedan was born in Los Angeles, California. He is married to Princess Noor bint Asem of Jordan.
