= Palace School =

The Palace School (Enderun-i Hümayun Mektebi) was a special school inside of the innermost court of Topkapı Palace that provided the education for the servants of the Ottoman dynasty, who went on to staff the administrative elite of the Ottoman Empire. These were converts to Islam, young males between 8 and 20 years old, who were mostly taken away from the rural Christian communities settled in Rumelia in a process known as devşirme.

The most promising of the latter were sent to the school located in the grounds of the imperial Topkapı Palace, where they studied law, linguistics, religion, music, art, and fighting, as well as performing functions as palace staff.

In parallel with the male segment of the school, the slave women of the imperial harem were also given an education. The slave girls of the palace school were taught the principles of Islam, as well as practical skills such as sewing, embroidering, dancing, singing, music, story-telling, and basic literacy. After completing their respective educations, male and female graduates were frequently married off to one another.

The number of pages serving in the palace varied, from approximately 300 in the time of Mehmed II to 700 by the beginning of the seventeenth century.
