= Princess Sana Asem =

Jordanian princess by marriage (born 1960)

- Born: Sana (or Sana'a) Kalimat; 16 November 1960 (age 64); Amman, Jordan
- Spouse: Prince Asem bin Nayef
- Issue: Princess Salha; Princess Nejla; Prince Nayef
- House: Hashemite (by marriage)
- Father: Adnan Mawloud Kalimat

Princess Sana'a Asem (née Sana Kalimat; born 16 November 1960) is a Jordanian princess due to her marriage to Prince Asim bin Nayef and she has Circassian origin. She is the daughter of Adnan Mawloud Kalimat (d. on 12 September 2019), leader of the Circassians tribal council of Jordan and mukhtar of the Circassians in the city of Amman.

== Education ==
She has a Bachelor of Arts in English Literature and Translation from the University of Petra in Amman.

== Activities ==
She has several activities in the capital Amman, where she attended the visit of King Abdullah II to the Jordanian Circassians at The Circassian Charitable Society with her husband, Prince Asim bin Nayef. Moreover, she also sponsors many Jordanian events, activities and conferences.

== Marriage and children ==
Princess Sana married Jordan's Prince Asem bin Nayef on 6 January 1986. Together, they have three children:

- Princess Salha (born 14 June 1987), on 4 April 2011 she married Mohammad Hashim Haj-Hassan.
- Princess Nejla (born 9 May 1988), on 23 October 2014 she married Nasser Osama Talhouni.
- Prince Nayef (born 22 January 1998), on 13 April 2021 he married Sharifa Farah Alluhaymaq.
