= Princess Noor bint Asem =

Jordanian princess

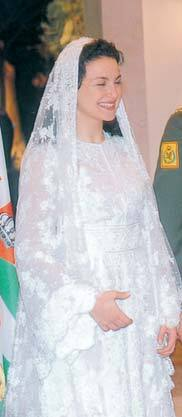
- Noor during her wedding ceremony in 2004
- Born: 6 October 1982 (age 43); Amman, Jordan
- Spouse: Hamzah bin Hussein (m. 2003; div. 2009) Amr Zedan (m. 2018)
- Issue: Princess Haya; Talal Zedan; Abdullah Zedan
- House: Hashemite
- Father: Prince Asem bin Nayef
- Mother: Firouzeh Vokhshouri

Princess Noor bint Asem (Arabic: نور بنت عاصم; born 6 October 1982) is a member of the Jordanian royal family.

== Family ==
Her father is Prince Asem bin Al Nayef, a grandson of King Abdullah I of Jordan and her mother is Firouzeh Vokhshouri. Her mother lives in Madrid, Spain, where she is an attaché for the Jordanian Embassy.

Princess Noor's parents divorced in 1985 and in 1986 her father married Princess Sana Asem.

== Education ==
Having studied her IGCSE's and A Levels at Kings College, Madrid, Spain, she then went on to graduate with a bachelor's degree in political communication from Emerson College in 2004, then a master's degree in Positive Leadership and Strategy in 2016 from IE Business School of Behavior and Social Sciences, Madrid.

== Marriages ==
On 29 August 2003, the Royal Jordanian Court announced Princess Noor's marriage to Prince Hamzah bin Hussein, her second cousin, had taken place. The marriage ceremony was held at al-Baraka Palace in Amman. The celebration of the marriage (Zifaf) was held on 27 May 2004 at Zahran Palace in Amman.

The couple divorced on 9 September 2009, although the divorce was not confirmed by the Royal Jordanian Court until an announcement in March 2010. Thereafter, Princess Noor reverted to the use of her maiden name Princess Noor bint Asem.

In March 2018, Princess Noor officially announced her engagement to Saudi businessman and horse breeder Amr Zedan, the future owner of the disqualified 2021 Kentucky Derby winner, Medina Spirit. The couple were married at the King Hussein Bin Talal Convention Centre, Dead Sea, Jordan, on 22 June 2018.

== Honours ==
=== National Honours ===
- Jordan:
  - Grand Cordon of the Order of the Star of Jordan

=== Foreign Honours ===
- Netherlands:
  - Dame Grand Cross of the Order of Orange-Nassau (30.10.2006)
