= Safiye Ünüvar =

Safiye Ünüvar was an Ottoman educator and memoir writer.

== Life ==
She was educated at Women's Teacher's Training College, Istanbul, and employed as the governess of the Ottoman princesses at the Palace School between 1915 and 1924. She was the first woman teacher with a formal education and a degree to be engaged as a teacher in the Ottoman Imperial Harem. She was highly respected and was a close friend of Dilfirib Kadın, consort of Sultan Mehmed V. She was the teacher of grandchildren of Sultan Mehmed V, especially the children of Şehzade Mehmed Ziyaeddin. She also helped Ziyaeddin himself with algebra lessons and medical notes.

== Memoirs ==
She published her memoirs in 1964. Her memoirs are a valuable source about the Ottoman Imperial Harem. Alongside Filizten Hanım, consort of Sultan Murad V, Nevzad Hanım, consort of Mehmed VI, Ayşe Sultan, daughter of Sultan Abdülhamid II, Leyla Achba and Rumeysa Aredba, ladies-in-waiting, she was one of the few women to have described the life of the Ottoman Imperial Harem in her memoirs; she is also the only employee of the Imperial Harem to have written her memoirs.
