= Hashemites =

Royal family of Jordan since 1921

House of Hashim الهاشميون Hashemites
- Hashemite banner
- Parent house: Dhawu Awn clan, a branch of Banu Qatadah, of Banu Hassan, of Banu Hashim, of Quraysh
- Country: Hejaz (1916–1925, in present-day Saudi Arabia); Syria (1920); Iraq (1921–1958); Jordan (1921–present); Jordanian West Bank (1948–1967)
- Founded: 1916; 110 years ago in Hejaz; 1920; 106 years ago in Syria; 1921; 105 years ago in Iraq and Jordan
- Founder: Husayn ibn Ali
- Current head: Jordan: Abdullah II
- Final ruler: Ali in Hejaz; Faisal I in Syria; Faisal II in Iraq
- Titles: King of Jordan; Emir of Transjordan; King of Iraq; King of Syria; Caliph; King of the Hejaz; King of the Arab Lands; King of Arabia; Sharif and Emir of Mecca; Crown Prince of Jordan
- Estate: Cf. Hashemite custodianship of Jerusalem holy sites
- Deposition: 1920; 106 years ago in Syria (Franco-Syrian War); 1925; 101 years ago in Hejaz (Saudi conquest); 1958; 68 years ago in Iraq (14 July Revolution)

The Hashemites (Arabic: الهاشميون, romanized: al-Hāshimiyyūn), officially the House of Hashim, are the royal family of Jordan, which they have ruled since 1921, and were the royal family of the kingdoms of Hejaz (1916–1925), Syria (1920), and Iraq (1921–1958). The family had ruled the city of Mecca continuously from the 10th century, frequently as vassals of outside powers, and ruled the thrones of the Hejaz, Syria, Iraq, and Jordan following their World War I alliance with the British Empire.

The family belongs to the Dhawu Awn, one of the branches of the Ḥasanid Sharifs of Mecca, also referred to as Hashemites. Their eponymous ancestor is traditionally considered to be Hashim ibn Abd Manaf, great-grandfather of the Islamic prophet Muhammad. Another claimed ancestor is Ali ibn Abi Talib. The Ḥasanid Sharifs of Mecca (from whom the Hashemite royal family is directly descended), including the Hashemites' ancestor Qatadah ibn Idris, were Zaydī Shīʿas until the late Mamluk or early Ottoman period, when they became followers of the Shāfiʿī school of Sunnī Islam.

The current dynasty was founded by Sharif Hussein ibn Ali, who was appointed as Sharif and Emir of Mecca by the Ottoman sultan Abdul Hamid II in 1908, then in 1916—after concluding a secret agreement with the British Empire—was proclaimed King of Arab countries (but only recognized as King of the Hejaz) after initiating the Arab Revolt against the Ottoman Empire. His sons Abdullah and Faisal assumed the thrones of Jordan and Iraq in 1921, and his first son Ali succeeded him in the Hejaz in 1924. This arrangement became known as the "Sharifian solution". Abdullah was assassinated in 1951, but his descendants continue to rule Jordan today. The other two branches of the dynasty did not survive; Ali was ousted by Ibn Saud after the British withdrew their support from Hussein in 1924–1925, and Faisal's grandson Faisal II was executed in the 1958 Iraqi coup d'état.

== History ==
=== Rulers of Mecca ===
According to historians Ibn Khaldun and Ibn Hazm, in c. 968 Ja'far ibn Muhammad al-Hasani came from Medina and conquered Mecca in the name of the Fatimid caliph al-Mu'izz, after the latter had conquered Egypt from the Ikhshidids. Jafar was from the wider Banu Hashim clan, albeit a different branch to the modern dynasty. The Banu Hashim claim to trace their ancestry from Hashim ibn Abd Manaf (died c. 497 AD), the great-grandfather of Muhammad, although the definition today mainly refers to the descendants of Fatimah bint Asad and her son Ali ibn Abi Talib.

Control of Mecca remained with the clan; when the Ottoman Turks took control of Egypt in 1517 AD, Sharif Barakat II quickly recognized the change in sovereignty, sending his son Abu Numayy II to the Ottoman sultan Selim I in Cairo, bearing the keys to the holy cities and other gifts. The Ottoman sultan confirmed Barakat and Abu Numayy in their positions as co-rulers of the Hejaz.

=== World War I and the Arab Revolt ===
Before World War I, Hussein bin Ali of the Hashemite Dhawu-'Awn clan ruled the Hejaz on behalf of the Ottoman sultan. For some time it had been the practice of the Sublime Porte to appoint the Emir of Mecca from among a select group of candidates. In 1908, Hussein bin Ali was appointed to the Sharifate of Mecca. He found himself increasingly at odds with the Young Turks in control at Istanbul, while he strove to secure his family's position as hereditary emirs. Hussein bin Ali's lineage and destined position as the Sharif of Mecca helped foster the ambition for an independent Arab kingdom and caliphate. These pretensions came to the Ottoman rulers' attention and caused them to "invite" Hussein to Istanbul as the guest of the sultan in order to keep him under direct supervision. Hussein brought his four sons, Ali, Abdullah, Faisal, and Zeid, with him. It was not until after the Young Turk Revolution that he was able to return to the Hijaz and was officially appointed the Sharif.

Of Hussein's four sons, Abdullah was the most politically ambitious and became the planner and driving force behind the Arab revolt. Abdullah received military training in both the Hijaz and Istanbul. He was the deputy for Mecca in the Ottoman Parliament between 1912 and 1914. During this period, Abdullah developed deep interest in Arab nationalism and linked his father's interest for autonomous rule in the Hijaz to complete Arab emancipation. In 1914 he met the British high commissioner, Lord Kitchener, in Cairo to discuss the possibility of the British supporting an Arab uprising against the Turks. The possibility of co-operation was raised but no commitment was made by either side. Shortly after Abdullah returned to Mecca, he became his father's foreign minister, political advisor, and one of the commanders of the Arab Revolt.

Faisal, Hussein's third son, played an active role in the revolt as commander of the Arab army, while the overall leadership was placed in the hands of his father. The idea of an Arab uprising against the Ottoman Empire was first conceived by Abdullah. Only after gradual and persistent nudging did Abdullah convince his father, the conservative Sharif of Mecca, to move from the idea of home rule of a portion of Arabia within the Ottoman Empire to complete independence of the entire Empire's Arab provinces. Hussein recognized the necessity of breaking away from the Empire in the beginning of 1914 when he realized that he would not be able to complete his political objectives within the framework of the Ottomans. To have any success with the Arab revolt, the backing of another great power was crucial.

Hussein regarded Arab unity as synonymous with his own kingship. He aspired to have the entire Arabian Peninsula, the region of Syria, and Iraq under his – and his descendants' – rule. After a year of fruitless negotiation, Sir Henry McMahon conveyed the British government's agreement to recognize Arab independence over an area that was much more limited than that to which Hussein had aspired. The Arab revolt, an Anglo-Hashemite plot in its essence, broke out in June 1916. Britain financed the revolt and supplied arms, provisions, direct artillery support, and experts in desert warfare including the soon to be famous T. E. Lawrence. The Hashemites promised more than they were able to deliver, and their ambitious plan collapsed. There were only a small number of Syrian and Iraqi nationalists who joined under the Sharifan banner while others remained loyal to the Ottoman sultan.

Sharif Hussein bin Ali rebelled against the rule of the Ottomans during the Arab Revolt of 1916. For Hashemite contribution to the Allied forces effort to bring down the Ottoman Empire, Britain promised its support for Arab independence. However, the McMahon–Hussein correspondence left territorial limits governing this promise obscurely defined leading to a long and bitter disagreement between the two sides.

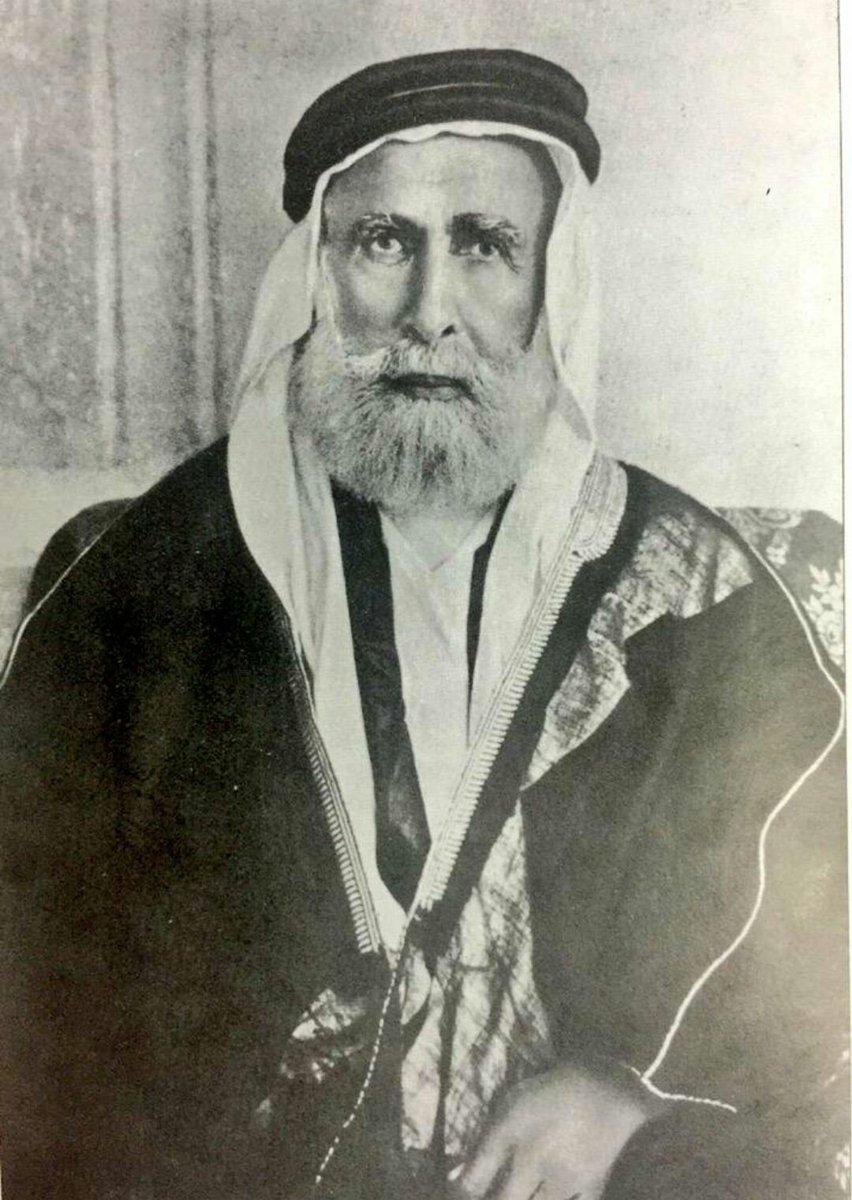
Hussein bin Ali, Sharif of Mecca (1853–1931), the founder of the modern dynasty

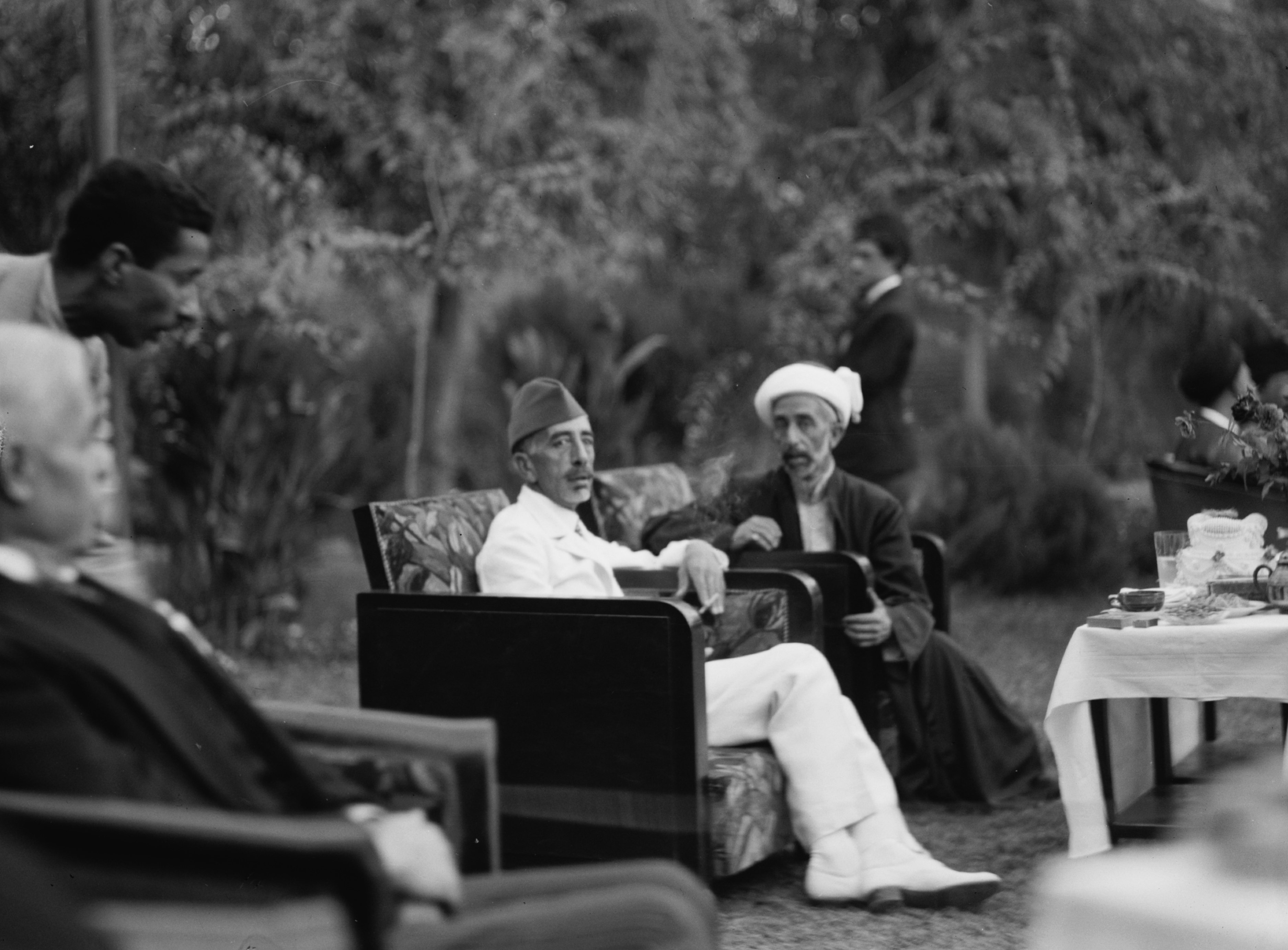
King Faisal I of Iraq and King Ali of Hejaz

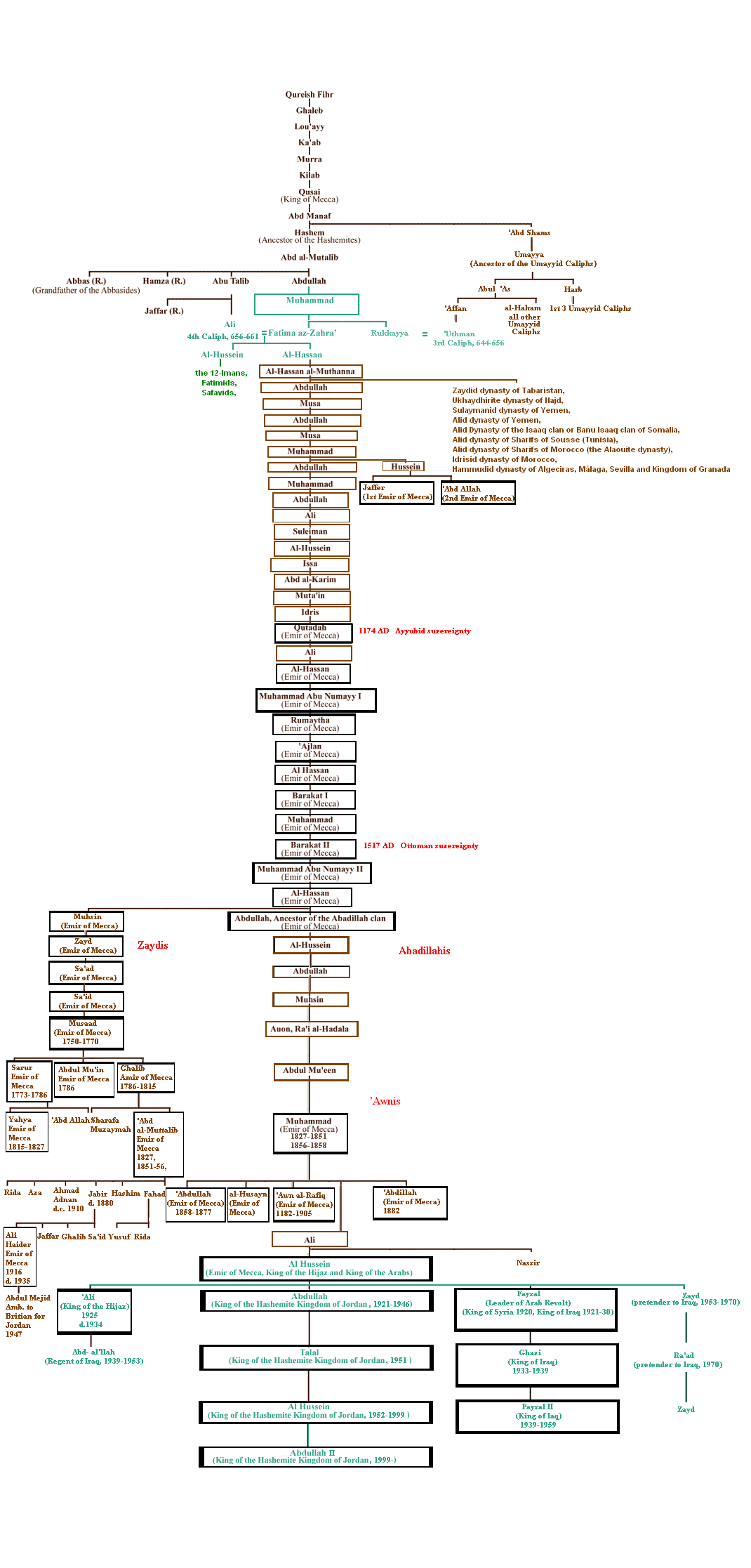
Hashemites family tree

=== Post-War: the Sharifian Solution ===
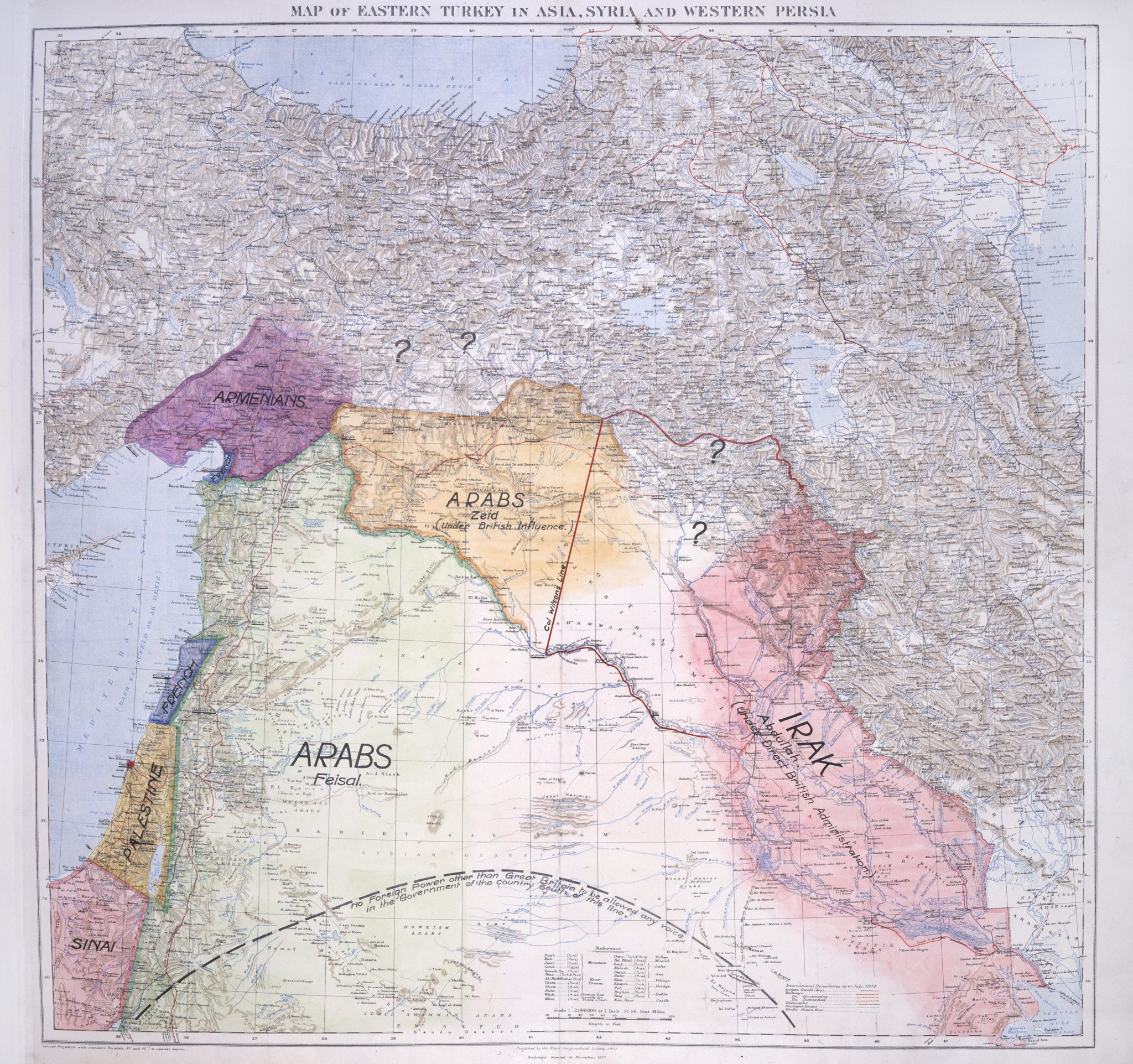
The original Sharifian Solution, illustrated in a map presented by T. E. Lawrence to the Eastern Committee of the War Cabinet in November 1918, was superseded by the policy agreed at the March 1921 Cairo Conference.

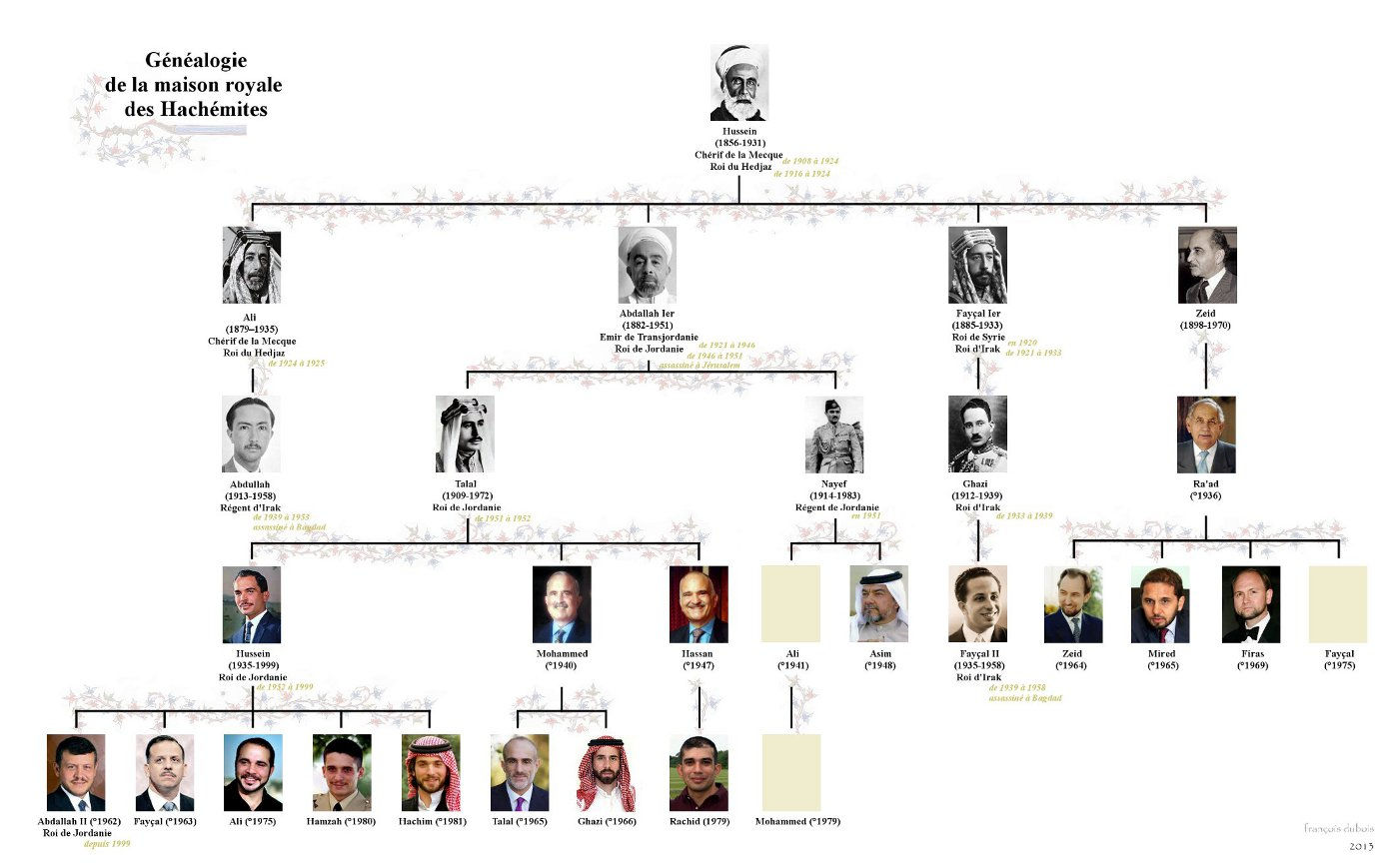
The family tree of the Hashemite dynasty

After the war, the British devised a "Sharifian Solution" to "[make] straight all the tangle" of their various wartime commitments. This proposed that three sons of Sharif Hussein would be installed as kings of newly created countries across the Middle East.

Given the need to rein in expenditure and factors outside British control, including France's removing of Faisal from Syria in July 1920, and Abdullah's entry into Transjordan (which had been the southern part of Faisal's Syria) in November 1920, the eventual Sharifian solution was somewhat different, the informal name for a British policy put into effect by Secretary of State for the Colonies Winston Churchill following the 1921 Cairo conference.

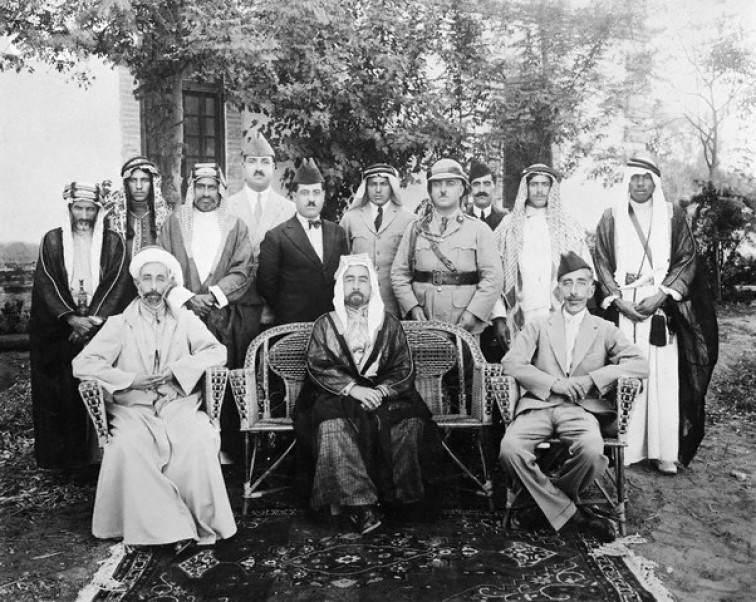
The sons of Hussein: Ali, Abdullah and Faisal, in the mid-1920s

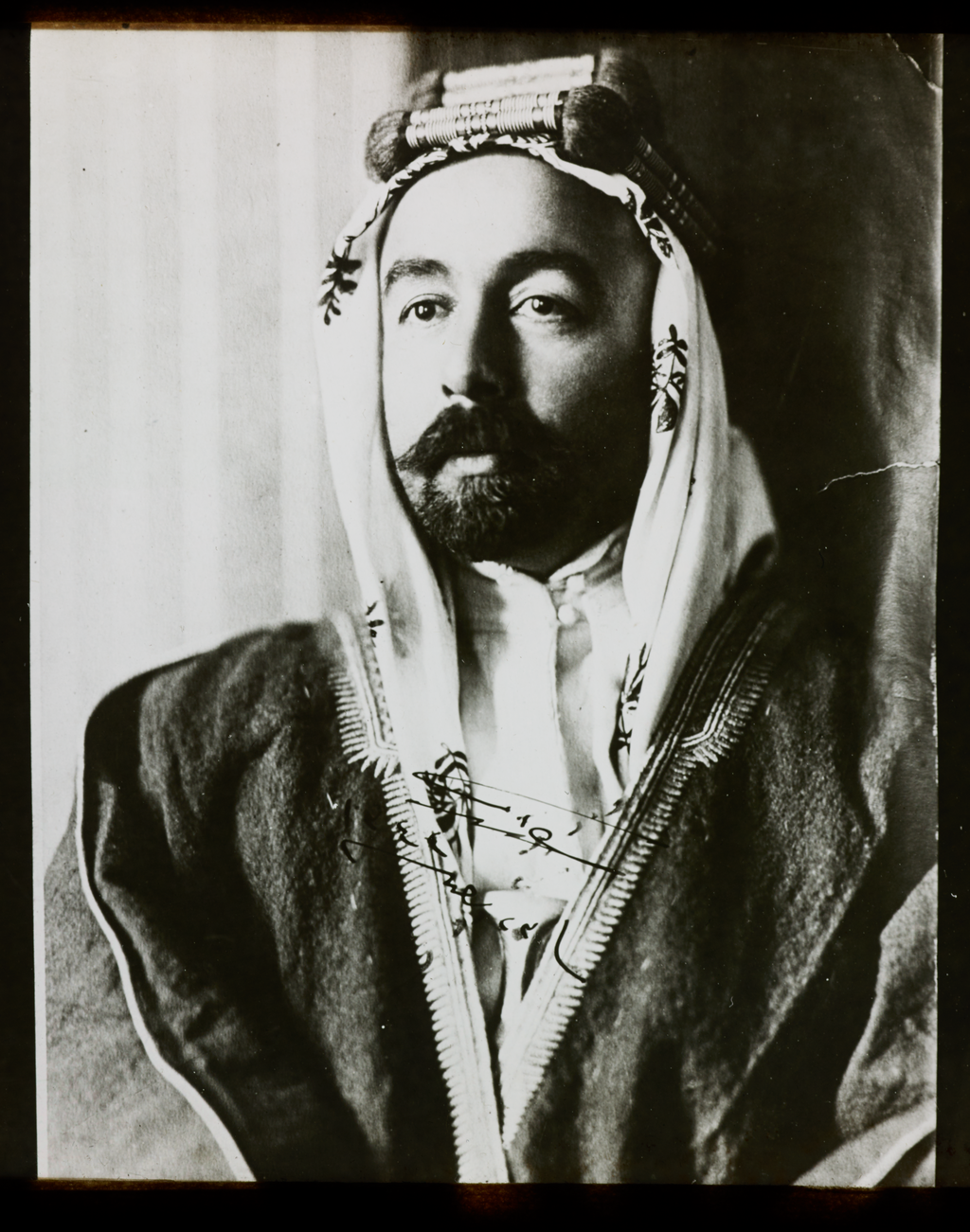
King Abdullah I, the founder of modern Jordan

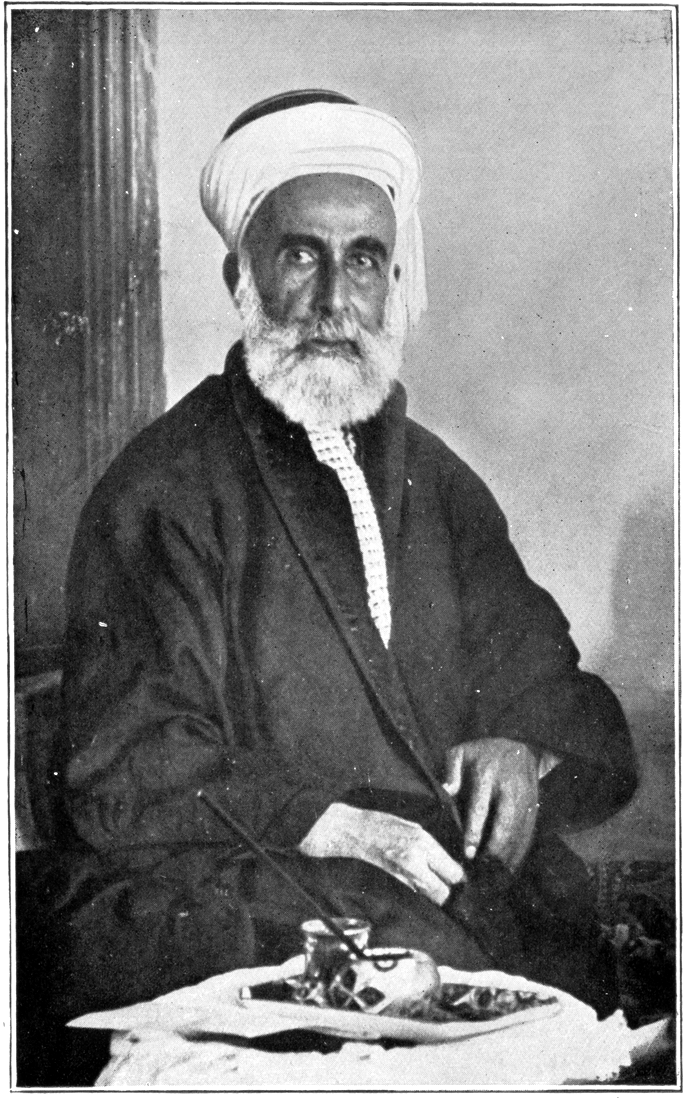
The Grand Sharif of Mecca and King of Hejaz the founder of Hashemite dynasty of Jordan and Iraq and Arabia

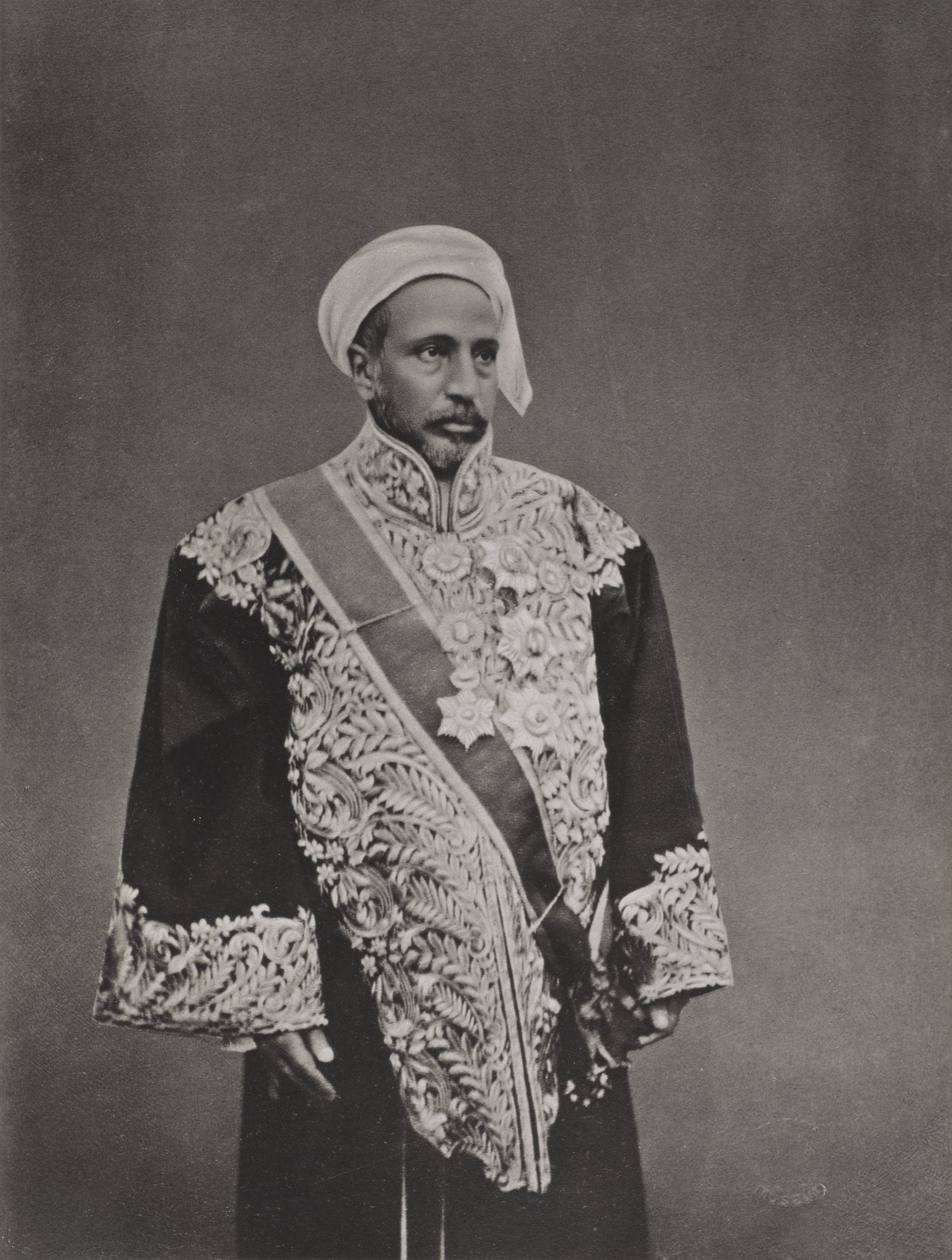
Grand Sharif of Mecca and Emir of Hejaz Sharif Awn

Hussein bin Ali had five sons:

- Ali, who briefly succeeded to the throne of Hejaz before its loss to the Saud family in 1925.
- Abdullah, became the emir of Transjordan in 1921 and king of Jordan in 1946, and whose descendants continue to rule the kingdom known ever since as the Hashemite Kingdom of Jordan.
- Faisal, briefly proclaimed King of the Arab Kingdom of Syria in 1920, became King of Iraq in 1921.
- Prince Zeid bin Hussein, who moved to Jordan when his brother's grandson, King Faisal II of Iraq, was overthrown and murdered in a coup in 1958.
- Hassan, died at a young age.

Hussein bin Ali continued to rule an independent Hejaz, of which he proclaimed himself king, between 1916 and 1924, after the collapse of Ottoman power, with the tacit support of the British Foreign Office. His supporters are sometimes referred to as "Sharifians" or the "Sharifian party". Hussein bin Ali's chief rival in the Arabian Peninsula, the king of the Najd (highlands), Ibn Saud, annexed the Hejaz in 1925 and established his own son, Faysal bin Abdulaziz Al Saud, as governor. The region was later incorporated into Saudi Arabia.

In Transjordan, the British government granted its independence in 1921 with Abdullah as ruler. The degree of independence that was afforded to the Arab states by colonial powers was an ongoing issue at the time, however in the case of Transjordan, the independence enjoyed was limited; with substantial influence and control reserved by British government in London. In domestic affairs the local ruler was given a considerable amount of power nonetheless; but these powers were exercised in an autocratic manner by the Hashemite family while remaining under the superintendence of the British Resident in Amman, as well as the British high commissioner in Jerusalem. Abdullah was assassinated in 1951, but his descendants continue to rule Jordan today.

In Iraq, the Hashemites ruled for almost four decades, until Faisal's grandson Faisal II was executed in the 1958 Iraqi coup d'état.

== Members and family tree ==
=== Ancestry ===
Hashim (eponymous ancestor)
Abdul-Muttalib
Abu Talib	Abdullah
Muhammad (Islamic prophet)
Ali (4th Caliph)	Fatima al-Zahra
Al-Ḥassan al-Mujtabā (5th Caliph)
Al-Ḥassan al-Mu'thannā
ʿAbd Allāh al-Kāmīl
Mūsā Al-Djawn
ʿAbd Allāh as-Ṣāliḥ
Mūsā II ibn ʿAbd Allāh
Muḥammad ath-Thāʿīr
ʿAbd Allāh ibn Muḥammad
ʿAlī
Suleiman
Al-Ḥussein
ʿĪssā
ʿAbd Al-Karīm
Mutā'īn
Idris (Qatādīds of Mecca)
Qatādah ibn Idris (Sharif of Mecca)
ʿAlī ibn Qatādah
Al-Hassan (Sharif of Mecca)
Abu Numayy I (Sharif of Mecca)
Rumaythah (Sharif of Mecca)
'Ajlan (Sharif of Mecca)
Al-Hassan (Sharif of Mecca)
Barakat I (Sharif of Mecca)
Muhammad (Sharif of Mecca)
Barakat II (Sharif of Mecca)
Abu Numayy II (Sharif of Mecca)
Al-Hassan (Sharif of Mecca)
Abd Allah ibn Hasan (Sharif of Mecca)
Al-Hussein
Abdullah
Muhsīn
ʿAwn, Ra'i Al-Hadala
Abdul Mu'een
Muhammad (Sharif of Mecca)
ʿAlī
Al-Hussein; Sharif of Mecca; November 1908 – 3 October 1924; King of Hejaz; October 1916 – 3 October 1924
Ali; King of Hejaz; 3 October 1924 – 19 December 1925 (Monarchy defeated by Saudi conquest)	Abdullah I Emir and later King of Jordan; 11 April 1921 – 20 July 1951	Faisal I King of Syria; 8 March 1920 – 24 July 1920; King of Iraq; 23 August 1921 – 8 September 1933	Zeid (pretender to Iraq)
Abdulilah (Regent of Iraq)	Talal; King of Jordan; 20 July 1951 – 11 August 1952	Ghazi; King of Iraq; 8 September 1933 – 4 April 1939	Ra'ad (pretender to Iraq)
Al-Hussein; King of Jordan; 11 August 1952 – 7 February 1999	Faisal II; King of Iraq; 4 April 1939 – 14 July 1958 (Monarchy overthrown in coup d'état)	Zeid
Abdullah II; King of Jordan; 7 February 1999 – present
Al-Hussein (Crown Prince of Jordan)

=== Main branch ===
- The King and Queen (The monarch and his wife)
  - The Crown Prince and Princess Rajwa (The King's elder son and daughter-in-law)
    - Princess Iman (The King's granddaughter)
  - Princess Iman (The King's elder daughter)
  - Princess Salma (The King's younger daughter)
  - Prince Hashem (The King's younger son)

=== Descendants of King Hussein of Jordan ===
- Queen Noor (King Hussein's fourth wife and widow)
  - Hamzah and Princess Basmah (The King's half-brother and half-sister-in-law)
    - Princess Haya (The King's half-niece)
    - Princess Zein (The King's half-niece)
    - Princess Noor (The King's half-niece)
    - Princess Badiya (The King's half-niece)
    - Princess Nafisa (The King's half-niece)
    - Prince Hussein (The King's half-nephew)
    - Prince Muhammad (The King's half-nephew)
  - Prince Hashim and Princess Fahdah (The King's half-brother and half-sister-in-law)
    - Princess Haalah Al-Noor (The King's half-niece)
    - Princess Raiyah Al-Noor (The King's half-niece)
    - Princess Fatima Al-Alia (The King's half-niece)
    - Prince Al-Hussein Haidara (The King's half-nephew)
    - Prince Mohammad Al-Hassan (The King's half-nephew)
  - Princess Iman (The King's half-sister)
  - Princess Raiyah (The King's half-sister)
  - Princess Haya (The King's half-sister)
  - Prince Ali and Princess Rym (The King's half-brother and half-sister-in-law)
    - Princess Jalila (The King's half-niece)
    - Prince Abdullah (The King's half-nephew)
- Princess Muna (King Hussein's second wife; The King's mother)
  - Prince Faisal and Princess Zeina (The King's brother and sister-in-law)
    - Princess Ayah (The King's niece)
    - Prince Omar (The King's nephew)
    - Princess Sara (The King's niece)
    - Princess Aisha (The King's niece)
    - Prince Abdullah (The King's nephew)
    - Prince Muhammad (The King's nephew)
    - Princess Rajaa (The King's niece)
  - Princess Alia (The King's former sister-in-law)
  - Princess Aisha (The King's sister)
  - Princess Zein (The King's sister)
  - Princess Alia (The King's half-sister)

=== Descendants of King Talal of Jordan ===
- Princess Taghrid (The King's aunt)
  - Prince Talal and Princess Ghida (The King's cousin and cousin-in-law)
    - Prince Hussein (The King's first cousin once removed)
    - Prince Muhammad (The King's first cousin once removed)
    - Princess Rajaa (The King's first cousin once removed)
  - Prince Ghazi and Princess Miriam (The King's cousin and cousin-in-law)
    - Princess Tasneem (The King's first cousin once removed)
    - Prince Abdullah (The King's first cousin once removed)
    - Princess Jennah (The King's first cousin once removed)
    - Princess Salsabil (The King's first cousin once removed)
- Princess Firyal (The King's former aunt)
- Prince Hassan and Princess Sarvath (The King's uncle and aunt)
  - Princess Rahma (The King's cousin)
  - Princess Sumaya (The King's cousin)
  - Princess Badiya (The King's cousin)
  - Prince Rashid and Princess Zeina (The King's cousin and cousin-in-law)
    - Prince Hassan (The King's first cousin once removed)
    - Prince Talal (The King's first cousin once removed)
- Princess Basma (The King's aunt)

=== Descendants of King Abdullah I of Jordan ===
- Prince Ali and Princess Reema (The King's cousin and cousin-in-law)
  - Prince Muhammad and Princess Sima (The King's second cousin and his wife)
    - Prince Hamzah (The King's second cousin)
    - Princess Rania (The King's second cousin)
    - Princess Karma (The King's second cousin)
    - Prince Haidar (The King's second cousin)
  - Princess Na'afa (The King's second cousin)
  - Princess Rajwa (The King's second cousin)
  - Princess Basma Fatima (The King's second cousin)
- Prince Asem and Princess Sana (The King's cousin and cousin-in-law)
  - Princess Yasmine (The King's second cousin)
  - Princess Sara (The King's second cousin)
  - Princess Noor (The King's second cousin)
  - Princess Salha (The King's second cousin)
  - Princess Nejla (The King's second cousin)
  - Prince Nayef and Princess Farah (The King's second cousin and his wife)
    - Prince Nayef (The King's second cousin)
- Princess Naifeh (The King's grandaunt)

=== Iraqi Hashemites (Descendants of Prince Ra'ad ibn Zaid) ===
The descendants of Iraqi Hashemite prince Ra'ad ibn Zaid have been awarded Jordanian citizenship and are addressed in the style of His Royal Highness and Prince in Jordan. Descendants include Prince Zeid bin Ra'ad, a Jordanian diplomat, who served as United Nations High Commissioner for Human Rights from 2014 to 2018, and Prince Mired bin Ra'ad.

=== Non-royals ===
A number of Dhawu Awn clansmen migrated with Emir Abdullah I to Transjordan in the early 1920s. Several of their descendants have gained prominent positions in the Jordanian state, including the positions of Chief of the Royal Court, Prime Minister, and Ambassador. Descendants of the Dhawu Awn clansmen are referred to as Sharifs and, other than Zaid ibn Shaker, have not been awarded princely title. Examples include former Prime Ministers and Royal Court Chiefs Sharif Hussein ibn Nasser, Sharif Abdelhamid Sharaf, Queen Zein Al-Sharaf (wife of King Talal and mother of King Hussein) and her brother Sharif Nasser bin Jamil.

Princely title in Jordan is typically restricted only to patrilineal descendants of any of the four sons of Hussein bin Ali, Sharif of Mecca.

Sharif Ali bin al-Hussein was the leader of the Iraqi Constitutional Monarchy political party and currently uses the title "Sharif".

Queen Dina Abdul-Hamid also was a member of the House of Hashim. She was entitled to use the honorific title sharifa of Mecca as an agnatic descendant of Hasan ibn Ali, the grandson of Muhammad.

==== Descendants of Prince Zaid ibn Shaker ====
Prince Zaid ibn Shaker, former PM and Commander-in-chief of the Jordanian military, was a member of the Dhawu Awn clan whose father Shaker ibn Zaid migrated to Transjordan with his cousin Abdullah I of Jordan. He was awarded the non-hereditary title of "prince" in 1996. His children, one son and one daughter, are addressed as "Sharifs" – not princes.

== Ja'alin tribe ==
The Ja'alin are of Arab origin and trace their origins to Ibrahim Ja'al, an Abbasid noble, whose clan originally hailed from the Hejaz in the Arabian Peninsula and married into the local Nubian population. Ja'al was a descendant of al-Abbas, an uncle of Muhammad. The Ja'alin trace their lineage to Abbas, uncle of Muhammad. According to the Royal Anthropological Institute of Great Britain and Ireland in 1888, the name Ja'alin does not seem to be derived from any founder of a tribe, but rather from the root Ja'al, an Arabic word meaning "to put" or "to stay", and in this sense it is those who settle. Various researchers have suggested that the Ja'alin are Arabized Nubians. A few 19th-century travellers claimed that Nubian was still spoken among them.

== See also ==
- Hashemite custodianship of Jerusalem holy sites
- Succession to the Jordanian throne

== Bibliography ==
- Adams, William Y. (1977). Nubia. Corridor to Africa. Princeton University. ISBN 0691093709.
- al-Sibā‘ī, Aḥmad ibn Muḥammad Aḥmad (1999) [1419 AH (1998/1999)]. Tārīkh Makkah تاريخ مكة (in Arabic). al-Amānah al-‘āmah lil-iḥtifāl bi murūr mi’ah ‘ām ‘alá ta’sīs al-Mamlakah al-‘Arabīyah al-Su‘ūdīyah.
- Allawi, Ali A. (2014). Faisal I of Iraq. Yale University Press. pp. 1–. ISBN 978-0-300-19936-9.
- Daḥlan, Aḥmad Zaynī (2007) [1887/1888]. Khulāṣat al-kalām fī bayān umarā' al-Balad al-Ḥarām خلاصة الكلام في بيان أمراء البلد الحرام (in Arabic). Dār Arḍ al-Ḥaramayn.
- Gerhards, Gabriel (2023). "Präarabische Sprachen der Ja'aliyin und Ababde in der europäischen Literatur des 19. Jahrhunderts". Der Antike Sudan (in German). 34. Sudanarchäologische Gesellschaft zu Berlin e.V: 135–152.
- Holt, P. M. (1970). "The Nilotic Sudan". In P. M. Holt; Ann K. S. Lambton; Bernard Lewis (eds.). The Cambridge History of Islam. Vol. 2A. Cambridge University.
- Kramer, Robert S.; Lobban, Richard A. Jr.; Fluehr-Lobban, Carolyn (2013). Historical Dictionary of the Sudan. The Scarecrow. ISBN 978-0810861800.
- Lawrence, T. E. (2000). Seven Pillars of Wisdom. Penguin Books Limited. ISBN 978-0-14-119208-6.
- McNamara, Robert (2010). The Hashemites: The Dream of Arabia. Haus Publishing. ISBN 978-1-907822-35-3.
- Paris, Timothy J. (23 November 2004). Britain, the Hashemites and Arab Rule: The Sherifian Solution. Routledge. ISBN 978-1-135-77191-1.
- Rudd, Jeffery A. (1993). Abdallah bin al-Husayn: The Making of an Arab Political Leader, 1908–1921 (PDF) (PhD). SOAS Research Online. pp. 45–46.
- Shlaim, Avi (1988). Collusion across the Jordan: King Abdullah, the Zionist movement and the partition of Palestine. Clarendon. ISBN 978-0-19-827831-3.
- Strovolidou, Emilia. "A young Palestinian law student's long journey to integration". UNHCR Cyprus. Cyprus: UNHCR.
- Teitelbaum, Joshua (2001). The Rise and Fall of the Hashimite Kingdom of Arabia. C. Hurst & Co. Publishers. ISBN 9781850654605.
- Uzunçarşılı, İsmail Hakkı (2003). Ashrāf Makkat al-Mukarramah wa-umarāʼihā fī al-ʻahd al-ʻUthmānī أشراف مكة المكرمة وأمرائها في العهد العثماني (in Arabic). Translated by Murād, Khalīl ʻAlī (1st ed.). Beirut: al-Dār al-‘Arabīyah lil-Mawsū‘āt.
