= Princess Basmah Hamzah =

Canadian born-Jordanian princess

- Born: Basmah Bani Ahmad Al-Outom; 25 May 1984 (age 42); Stratford, Ontario, Canada
- Spouse: Hamzah bin Hussein (m. 2012)
- Issue: Princess Zein; Princess Noor; Princess Badiya; Princess Nafisa; Prince Hussein; Prince Muhammad
- House: Hashemite (by marriage)
- Father: Mahmoud Hassan Bani Ahmad Al-Outom
- Mother: Halloul Hassan

Princess Basmah Hamzah (Arabic: بسمة حمزة, née Basmah Bani Ahmad Al-Outom Arabic: بسمة بني أحمد العتوم; born 1979) is the second wife of Hamzah bin Hussein of Jordan.

== Family ==
Her father is Mahmoud Hassan Bani Ahmad Al-Outom (b. 1948) , who was born and raised in the town of Kufr Khall north of Jerash, and is a businessman in Canada. Her mother is Heloul Al Atoum (b. 1951). Princess Basmah has three siblings: Bassam (b. 1978), Nader (b. 1981), and Yesmeen (b. 1987).

== Education and career ==
Princess Basmah enrolled at Stratford Central Secondary School. She attended Fanshawe College in London, Ontario before enrolling at the University of Western Ontario. She left her studies in Mathematics at the University of Western Ontario to practise the art of aviation as a hobby in Canada, before moving to Jordan in 2005. In Jordan she trained with The Middle East Aviation Academy in Amman to obtain a flight instructor license and after, in 2007, joined Ayla Aviation Academy in Aqaba. She worked as a chief pilot at the Royal Aero Sports Club of Jordan in Aqaba and Wadi Rum, of which Prince Hamzah is president. She was Jordan's first female pilot to obtain a basic aerobatics certificate. She met Hamzah at the Dubai Air Show in November 2011.

== Marriage and family ==
On 12 January 2012, the Royal Jordanian Court announced Prince Hamzah's marriage to Basmah Bani Ahmad. The marriage ceremony was held at the Amman home of the Princess' grandfather.

The ceremony was attended by King Abdullah II, Queen Rania, Queen Noor, a number of Royal family members, Basmah's father (Mahmoud Hassan Bani Ahmad), Basmah's mother (Halloul Muhammad Bani Ahmad), and other family members.

King Abdullah II held a lunch banquet at Basman Palace on the occasion of the wedding of Hamzah and Basma that was attended by a number of Royal family members, the prime minister, Senate president, Lower House speaker, president of the Judicial Council, Royal Court chief, other senior officials and Members of the Bani-Ahmad Family.

Hamzah bin Hussein and Basmah al-Hamzah have six children:

- Princess Zein bint Hamzah, born 3 November 2012
- Princess Noor bint Hamzah, born 5 July 2014
- Princess Badiya bint Hamzah, born 8 April 2016
- Princess Nafisa bint Hamzah, born 7 February 2018
- Prince Hussein bin Hamzah, born 8 November 2019
- Prince Muhammad bin Hamzah, born 8 February 2022

In the 2021 arrests of persons involved in alleged sedition against the crown of Jordan, Basmah was placed under house arrest along with Prince Hamzah, with the government accusing her of contacting a foreign intelligence officer to leave the country when arrests began. While she is no longer under formal house arrest, her movements have allegedly since been restricted alongside her husband.
