= Hadeel Abdel Aziz =

Jordanian legal expert and human rights defender

- هديل عبد العزيز
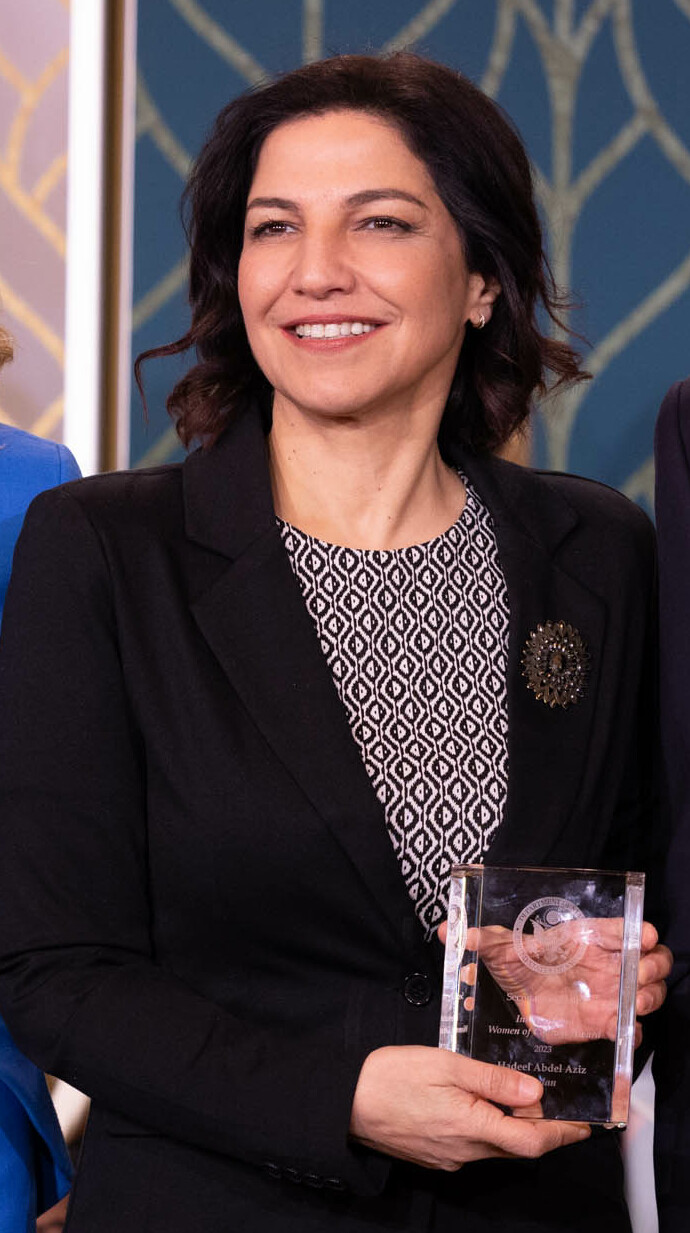
- Hadeel Abdel Aziz 2023
- Education: Bachelor of Laws from the University of Jordan. Certified as a judicial administrator by Michigan State University.
- Occupations: Founder and Executive Director, JCLA; Court administration unit manager, USAID
- Years active: 2004 to present
- Organization: JCLA
- Awards: International Women of Courage Award. Franco-German Prize for Human Rights and the Rule of Law. Eisenhower Fellowships.
- Website: www.jcla-org.com/en

Hadeel Abdel Aziz (Arabic: هديل عبد العزيز) is a Jordanian Legal expert and human rights activist who is also a founding member and executive director of the Jordan-based NGO, Justice Center for Legal Aid (JCLA). Her work includes advocating for judicial reform, court automation, and providing access to justice projects through a network of legal aid clinics that help others in civil, criminal, and family, including Sharia law. On 8 March, she received the 2023 International Women of Courage Award, which was presented to her and other nominees by Jill Biden and Antony J. Blinken at the U.S. Department of State. She is also the recipient of the Franco-German Prize for Human Rights and the Rule of Law award, which was presented to her during the 60th anniversary of the Elysée Treaty on 22 January 2023.

== Education and certification ==
Abdel Aziz holds a Bachelor of Laws from the University of Jordan and became the first Jordanian to be certified as a judicial administrator by Michigan State University.

== Career ==
=== Court administration unit manager ===
Before founding JCLA, Abdel Aziz worked for USAID from 2004 to 2009 as a Court Administration Unit manager for its Rule of Law Program.

=== Legal empowerment work ===
Her work under JCLA is reported as providing service for the underprivileged, advocating for state-funded legal aid with the overall focus on legal empowerment— ″putting the law in the hands of the average person″ through tools tailored to educate people on their fundamental rights and support communities to navigate and set-up solutions and tools.

=== Human rights defender ===
As a frontline defender of various marginalized groups including juveniles, refugees, migrants, and survivors of sexual and gender-based violence, DOS applauded Aziz for exhibiting a clear-sighted vision to help strengthen the justice system in Jordan. Her advocacy work against honor crimes- detaining women for their own “protection” was also highlighted. As a board of Trustees at the National Center for Human Rights, she highlighted the importance of details in rights-based issues to young Jordanian reporters.

=== Women, children, and victims of terrorism ===
Her other effort includes advocating for the abolishment of the controversial Jordan's rape law, Article 308, and help enforcing the persecution of criminals. She highlighted her work in a distinguished panel at the UN and participated in World Bank-sponsored projects, and other platforms. At the UN panel, she discussed the importance of accessing justice for victims of terrorism during the Global Congress of Victims of Terrorism event.

=== Migrant workers ===
For the ongoing issue of migrant workers and decry against the abuses of Jordanian employers, Abdel Aziz recognized the gap, stated the repatriation of nine abused Filipinos domestic helpers, and discussed challenges in the implementation of law and tools.

=== International support ===
In 2015, the World Bank selected JCLA and Abdel Aziz to provide the Nigerian government with technical support in which she engaged with a series of legal aid capacity-building and quality assurance workshops in Nigeria.

== Awards and fellowship ==
=== Eisenhower Fellowship ===
Abdel Aziz obtained funding from the Eisenhower Fellowships to implement a country-wide Pro bono program that partners with the Jordanian legal system and serves the underrepresented.

=== International Women of Courage Award ===
Abdel Aziz is a recipient of the 2023 International Women of Courage Award which was hosted by the U.S. Department of State and specifically awarded to those who demonstrated exceptional courage, strength, and leadership. Her work on defending human rights and legally representing the underserved was recognized.

=== Franco-German Prize for Human Rights and the Rule of Law ===
She received this award for her lifelong dedication to the rule of law and her work in promoting and defending the human rights of women and girls. The award is given to human rights defenders worldwide, who work every day, often in dangerous circumstances, to protect and strengthen human rights.

== See also ==
- International Women of Courage Award
- Justice Center for Legal Aid
- List of women's rights activists
- Human rights in Jordan
- Law of Jordan
