= Jordan coup d'état =

Jordan coup d'état may refer to:

- 1957 alleged Jordanian military coup attempt
- 2021 arrests in Jordan, a response to an alleged coup attempt

== See also ==
- Black September, a civil war fought between the Jordanian government and the Palestinian Liberation Organization
