= SUF =

SUF may refer to:

- Scouts unitaires de France
- Socialistisk Ungdomsfront (Socialist Youth Front, Denmark)
- Syndikalistiska Ungdomsförbundet (Swedish Anarcho-syndicalist Youth Federation)
- SUF, the IATA code for the Lamezia Terme International Airport in Italy
- Souf, a town in Jordan
- The lexical root of Sufi is variously traced to صُوف, ṣūf "wool"
- Selective Unforgeability or Strong Unforgeability, security definitions for digital signatures
- Steven Universe Future, an American animated television series on Cartoon Network that serves as an epilogue to Steven Universe
- Society of Universal Friends, a religious group led by the Public Universal Friend
