= Souf =

Souf مدينة سوف
- City
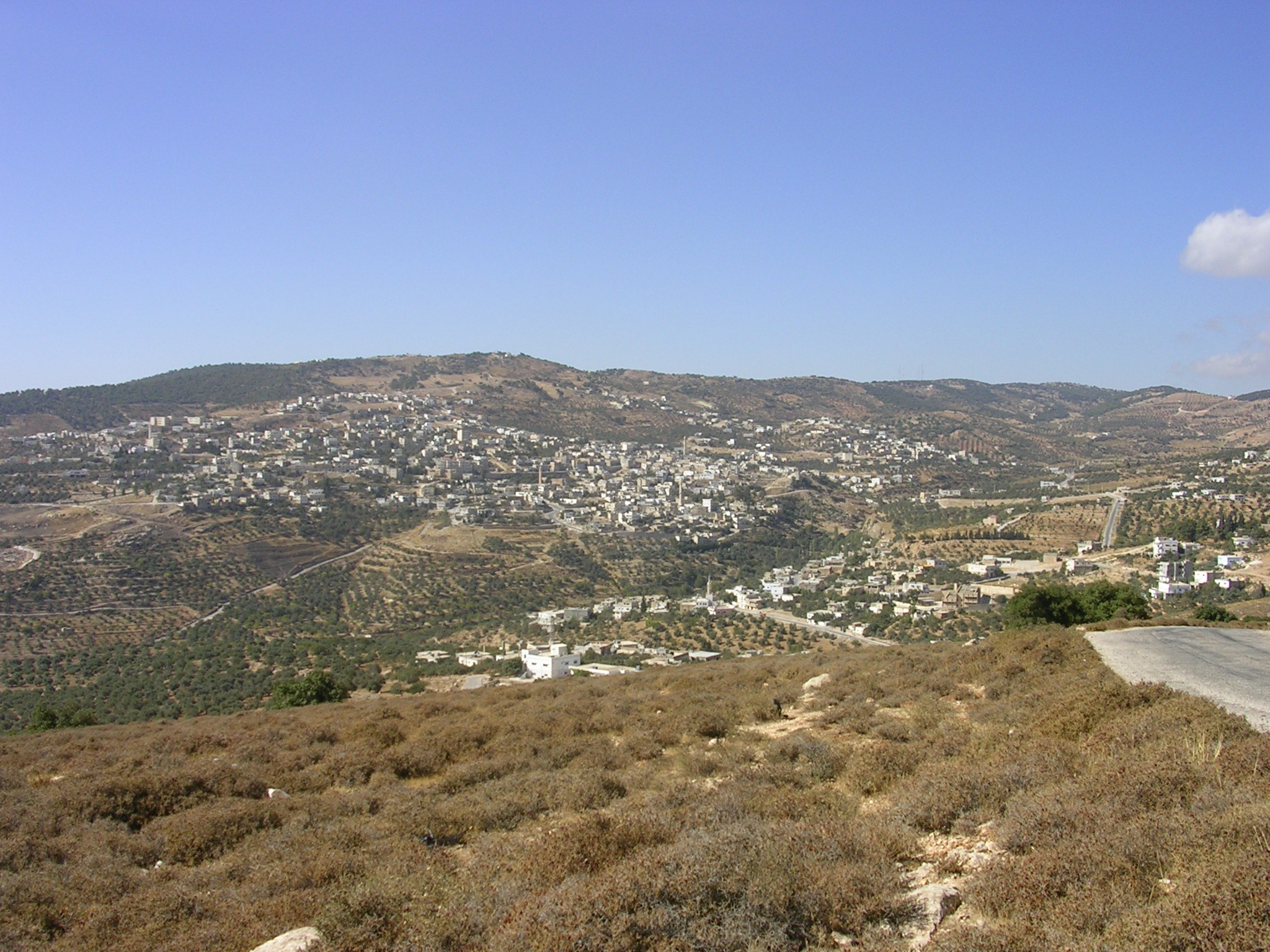

- Location within Jordan
- Coordinates: 32°18′45″N 35°50′14″E
- PAL: 228/190
- Country: Jordan
- Province: Jerash Governorate
- Time zone: GMT +2
  - Summer (DST): +3
- Area code: +(962)2

Souf (سوف) is a town in Jerash Governorate, Jordan, set over a series of mountains at an altitude of 1,000 meters. Souf is situated 35 miles north of Amman, the capital of Jordan. The total population of Souf exceeds 14,000 people, while it covers a wide area of agricultural land, considered the widest in Jerash.

For many centuries, Souf was the centre of al-Meradh region; which has been called المعراض in Arabic, because it defeated Bedouins used to attack on north Jordan during the 19th century. Later, this region was the base for the governorate of Jerash which was created according to the kingdom's new administrative divisions. A number of villages are considered an extension of the old town of Souf including: Kufr Khall, Balila, Thughretasfour, Jaba, Zagreet, Majar, and Megbleh. Recently, Souf has been attached to greater city of Jerash due to its proximity to the new city.

== People ==
Some Natives of Souf live in the city of Jerash and comprise small minorities in Amman and Irbid. During the last century, some Soufanian individuals have emigrated to the Arabian Peninsula, Europe and to the United States.

The main profession in Souf was agriculture for centuries, but during the last decades, a growing number of people are working in higher education, government, the military and business.

== Traditions ==
The women in Souf (Muslims, and Christians) used to wear a long black dress embroidered with colourful stripes called "The Costume" or Eshorsheh Essoufaniieh or Soufanian Dress. The dress has a unique design that reflect the special identity of Souf.

The men used to wear a special type of robe which comes in two forms: an open style called Maznook which is tightened to the body using a leather belt, and a closed style called Doshdash. They also wear a special type of wide trousers called Serwal, and a head cover comes in white and red called Kufeiieh, Hattah or Selk which is fixed to the head using a black headband called Eqall. In special celebrations and ceremonies they wear a special type of cloak made of camel hair called Abaah comes in black, brown or beige. The costume is found in other regions in the north of Jordan with slight differences depending on the place.

== Agriculture ==
Al-Magasel (Arabic: المغاسل) is located in Souf. A wide range of fruits is grown in Souf, including olives, grapes, figs, peaches, pears, plums, apples, apricots, almonds, and cherries. Beside the irrigated lands in Souf valley, there is a wide area of non-irrigated lands scattered over a number of hills and mountains which depend on seasonal rains. Locales include Manarah, Koom, Mrab'ah, Sabatah, Sahlat, Fanadeg, Mansoura, and Wadi Warran.

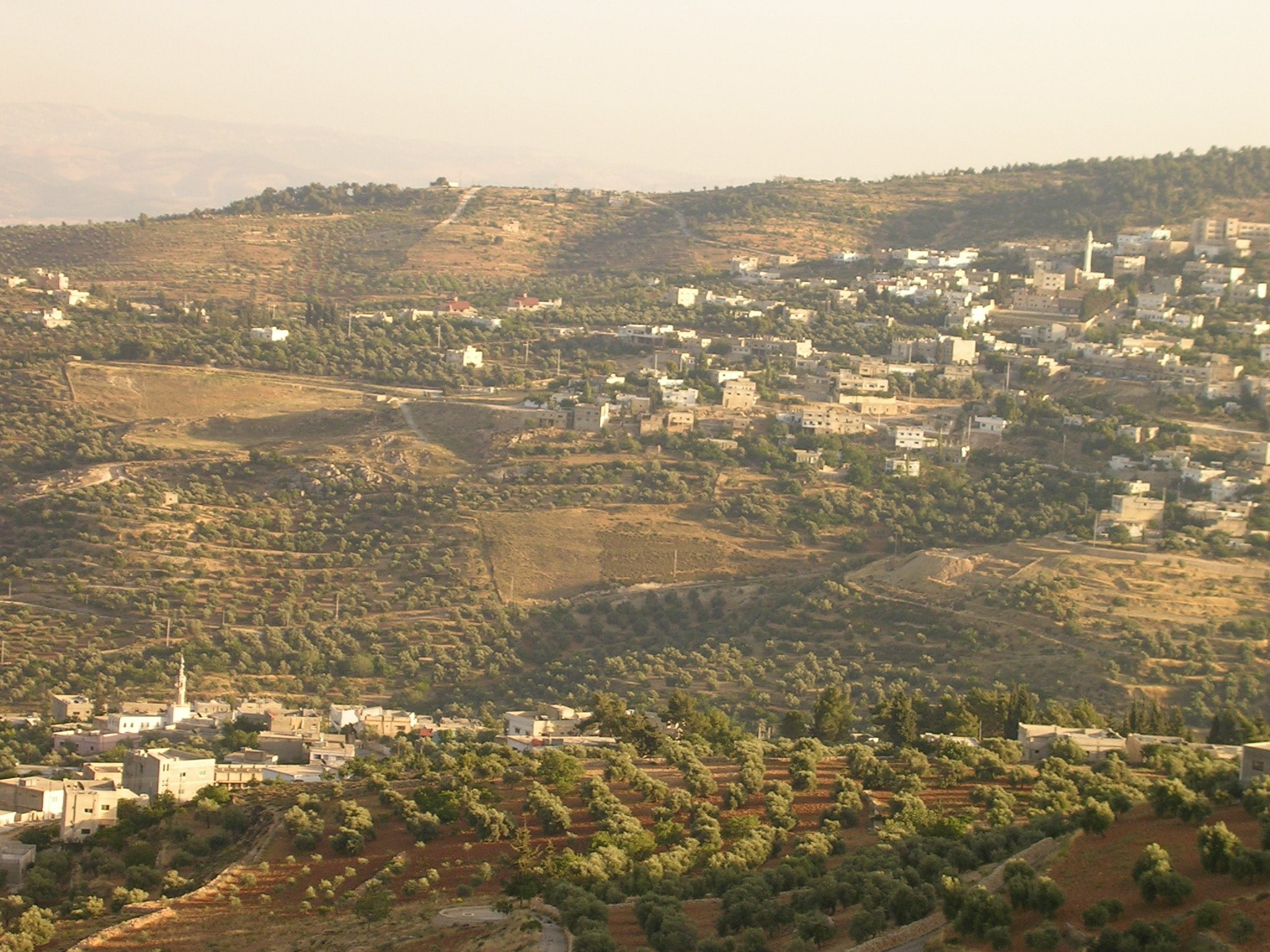
Farms in Jerash Governorate

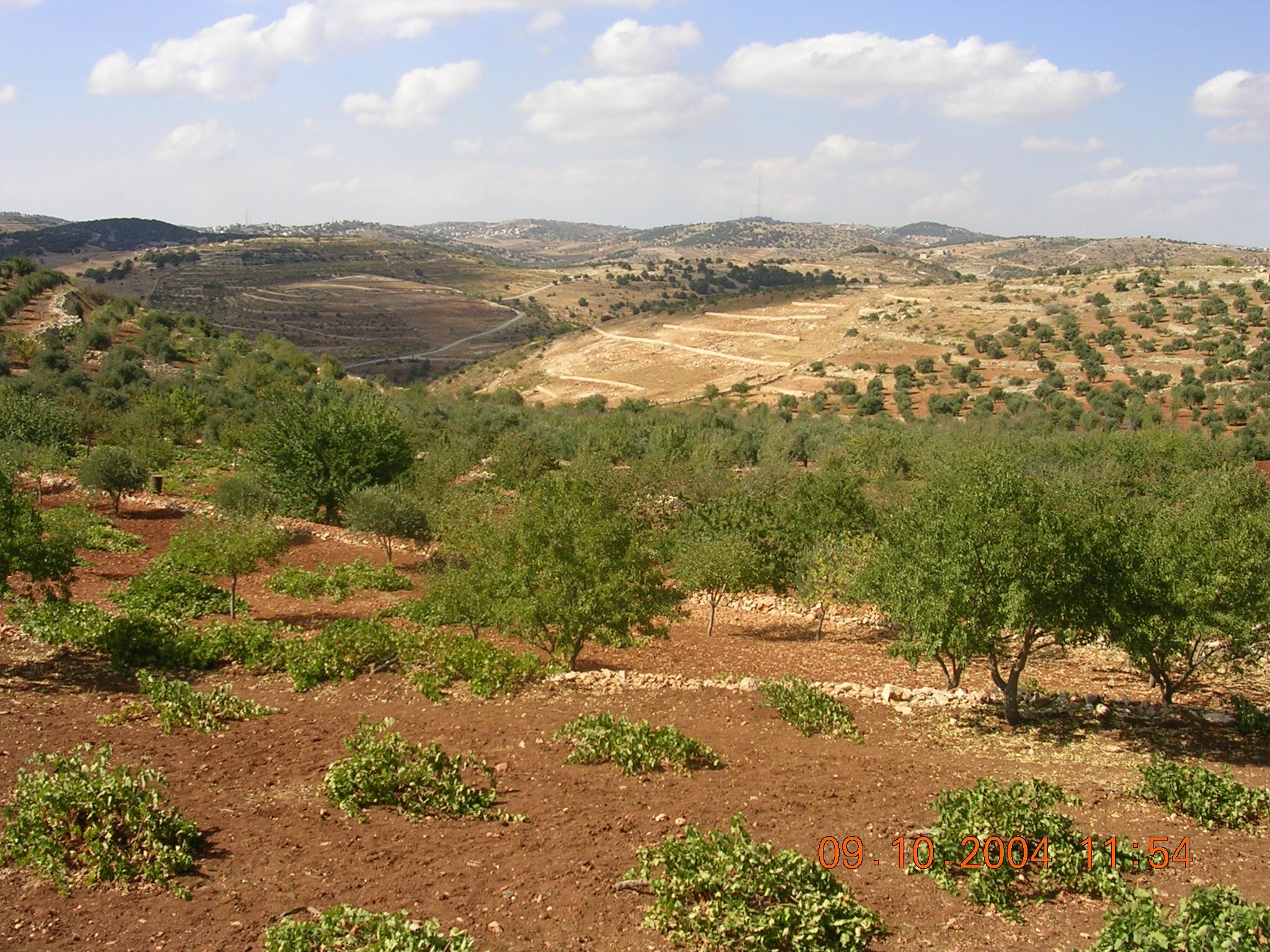
A farm in the mountains of Ajloun
