= Borma Sub-district =

Borma
- Sub-district
- Interactive map of Borma
- Country: Jordan
- Governorate: Jerash

Population (2015)
  - Total: 6,057
- Time zone: GMT +2
  - Summer (DST): +3

Borma (Arabic: برما) is one of the sub-districts of Qaṣabah Jarash district in Jerash governorate, Jordan.
