= Kufr Khall =

Kufr Khall كفرخل
- Town
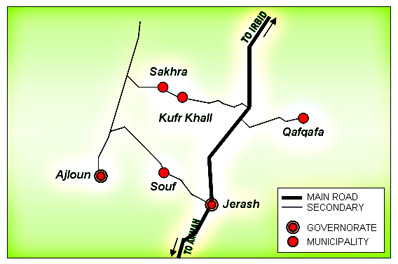
- Location of Kufr Khall

- Location within Jordan
- Coordinates: 32°21′25″N 35°53′00″E
- Grid position: 233/196
- Country: Jordan
- Governorate: Jerash Governorate
- Elevation: 1,000 m (3,300 ft)
- Time zone: GMT +2
  - Summer (DST): +3
- Area code: +(962)2

Kufr Khall, (also written Kufur Khall, Kufr Khal) (Arabic: كفر خل), is a town in the north of Jordan, in the Jerash Governorate. The origin of its name, is from Syriac kafr meaning the village or the country and from Arabic khall that means vinegar, or more generally, grape. So the words Kufr Khall stand for 'the village of grapes'. Effectively, Kufr Khall is still famous for its well-known grape production.

== Geography ==
Kufr Khall is located at the west of the main road connecting Jerash to Irbid. The village is built on three main hills; Jabal Snad, Jabal Ahed and al-Jabal al-Gharbi. Kufr Khall represents an important link between Ajloun Mountains and the large flat land of Houran. The total area of the village is estimated 6 km^{2}, of which 4 belonging to woodland areas.

== History ==
=== Kufr Khall as a rural centre ===
Kufr Khall was no doubt an important rural centre since Roman domination of Jordan, and a complex of several tombs (discovered in 1981) clearly shows the importance of Kufr Khall in the Byzantine age. Umayyad and Abbasid presence in Kufr Khall is also witnessed by several ruins. Kufr Khall saw a moment of decline of its splendor in the 17th century; anyway, important documents proof the presence of Kufr Khall as a rural community in the early Ottoman age.

=== Pre-Islamic era ===
A number of stone-made instruments were found at one kilometer of distance from the town, and labeled as Neolithic. There are oral narrations about the presence of an antique Roman church (called the white church) in the past. Mosaics were also found in different locations. The Roman dominion of the zone is visible in three different places: al- Deyr, Hattin and in Kufr Khall itself.

=== Islamic era ===
Kufr Khall was conquered by Islamic Armies commanded by Sharhabeel ibn Hasana as a direct result of Battle of Fahl in 635 A.D. Mameluke ceramics were found in several sectors of Kufr Khall, and diverse houses built by Mamelukes were rebuilt on the rising of the Ottoman dominion of the zone.

In 1596 it appeared in the Ottoman tax registers named as Kafr Hall, situated in the nahiya (subdistrict) of Bani al-Asar, part of the Sanjak of Hawran. It had 34 households and 15 bachelors; all Muslim. The villagers paid a fixed tax-rate of 25% on agricultural products; including wheat, barley, summer crops, vineyards/fruit trees, goats and bee-hives. The total tax was 11,500 akçe.

In 1838 Kufr Khall was noted as a ruin.

In 1961 the population of Kufr Khall was 1,159 inhabitants.

== Economy ==
Kufr Khall is famous for its olive oil, and there is a seasonal fair (market) for the trading of this product. Other agricultural products are grapes, figs, apples and pomegranate. Several handcraft, cheese and traditional products are made also.

== Social life ==
=== Religion ===
The inhabitants are all Sunni Muslims, there are three principal mosques in Kufr Khall, an old, now restored, eastern mosque, a western mosque built in 1984 (al Hajj Abdallah Mosque) and a new mosque named Abu Bakr as- Siddiq. Two historical shrines (tombs of Awlya') are located in Kufr Khall.

=== Traditions ===
The traditions of Kufr Khall people are similar to the northern Jordanians. Must be mentioned: the Sbu'yyeh (food offered after a week of the burial to the dead's family), the Madaleh (welcoming people for three days after funeral and offering them coffee), the Khamisyyah (religious sacrifice of goats in spring), important religious festivities, such Eid ul-Fitr, Eid al Adha (al Eid al Kabir) and Al-Mawlidu N-Nabawi Sh-Sharif, have their rituals for the people of Kufr Khall.

== Prince Hamzah Natural Reserve ==
The Prince Hamzah Natural Reserve consists of 40 hectares of natural forests. It is administered and managed by the Department of Natural Resources and Environment in Jordan University of Science and Technology

The reserve was opened by Prince Hamzah bin Al Hussein on 16 August 2004. It harbors a large number of trees and animals such as the Palestine Oak, Aleppo pine and the Greek Strawberry Tree. It is one of the best natural views around the village and they are a lot of farms around it that belongs to the locals like the one owned by Mousa al Abed which was developed and built in 1980.

== Bibliography ==
- Government of Jordan, Department of Statistics (1964). First Census of Population and Housing. Volume I: Final Tables; General Characteristics of the Population (PDF).
- Hütteroth, W.-D.; Abdulfattah, K. (1977). Historical Geography of Palestine, Transjordan and Southern Syria in the Late 16th Century. Erlanger Geographische Arbeiten, Sonderband 5. Erlangen, Germany: Vorstand der Fränkischen Geographischen Gesellschaft. ISBN 3-920405-41-2.
- Robinson, E.; Smith, E. (1841). Biblical Researches in Palestine, Mount Sinai and Arabia Petraea: A Journal of Travels in the year 1838. Vol. 3. Boston: Crocker & Brewster.
