= Correction centers in Jordan =

Correctional facilities in Jordan

There are 18 correction and rehabilitation centers / CRCs (ar. مركز اصلاح وتاهيل) in the Hashemite Kingdom of Jordan which are operated by the Public Security Departments prison service which answers to the Ministry of Interior.

== List of Jordanian prisons ==
Qafqafa, al Mwaggar 1, and Swaqa incarcerate only convicts and the rest house detainees and convicts in separate housing areas.

Swaqa correction center is the largest of all these centers with a capacity of 2200 inmates. It provides vocational and cultural rehabilitation programs

Fuhais mental hospital accommodates mentally ill prisoners.

The three main inspection bodies include Human Rights Watch, ICRC and the National Centre for Human Rights (Jordan)

CRC (Latinized name)	Arabic name	Established	Designcapacity	Georeference	In operation?
Suwaqa prison	سجن سواقه		2000	31.380392°N 36.071727°E	yes
Qafqafa prison	سجن قفقفا			32.363823°N 35.928260°E	
Muwaqqar I			896	31.787919°N 36.261672°E	yes
Muwaqqar II			240		yes
Al-Karak prison	سجن الكرك				
Ma'an prison	سجن معان				
Al-Aqaba prison			192		
Al/Balqa/Salt prison					
Um Lulu est.			900		
Salhoub					
Zarqa prison	سجب الزرقاء		900	32.104484°N 36.128678°E	yes
Marka prison	سجب ماركا		900	31.978043°N 36.018584°E	yes
Irbid prison	سجن إربد				
Al-Rusayfah Juvenile Prison				32.066602°N 36.048951°E	
Detention and Interrogation Center of the GID					yes
Al-Jafr prison	سجن الجفر				
Juweideh prison / men					
Juweideh prison / women					
Birain prison	سجن بيرين		650		

== Human rights abuses ==
- The use of Castor oil pills during the initial examination. The goal is to provoke diarrhea in order to prevent prisoners from smuggling pills, drugs, razor blades and the like which were previously swallowed into the prison.
- Beatings by Darak and prison guards with metal sticks and cables

== Notable events ==
- Riots broke out among the Tanzimat of Juwaida, Swaqa and Qafqafa in March and April 2006
