= Justice Center for Legal Aid =

Non-government organization

- مركز العدل للمساعدة القانونية
- Formation: 2008
- Purpose: legal aid
- Headquarters: Amman, Jordan
- Region served: Jordan
- Key people: Hadeel Abdel Aziz, Executive Director
- Website: www.jcla-org.com/en

Justice Center for Legal Aid (JCLA) is a Jordan-based non-profit and non-governmental organization that was established in 2008 and is registered with the Jordanian Societies Registry.

Since being founded in Amman in 2008, JCLA has expanded from a single legal aid clinic in Amman to Jordan's largest legal aid provider, with 21 clinics spread throughout the country's 12 governorates. JCLA is the first legal aid organization established in Jordan, a country with 13 active organizations that provide legal aid. JCLA defends more clients than the other 12 organizations combined.

Each month, JCLA provides legal consultations to approximately 375 beneficiaries, legal counsel to approximately 150 beneficiaries in 200 cases, and awareness sessions to approximately 3600 vulnerable citizens. Nearly 80 per cent of recipients of the center's services are Jordanian citizens, and between 60 and 70 per cent of them are women who face financial hardships.

== Services ==
JCLA holds awareness-raising sessions and informational campaigns targeting people in Jordan to educate them about their rights and obligations under the law. Additionally, it provides legal aid for those who are unable to afford a private lawyer, handling approximately 2000 cases per year as of 2017, with approximately 5000 consultancy cases per year. JCLA also delivers over 1,600 awareness lectures annually, in partnership with several governmental and non-governmental partners. JCLA's legal assistance includes providing legal counseling for both criminal matters as well as civil disputes. JCLA also provides assistance for registration for birth, death, and marriage certificates to allow access to government services.

JCLA has programs to support migrants and refugees, women, juveniles, victims of domestic assault, and people with disabilities. JCA provides legal representation and assistance for civil, criminal and family law (sharia) cases.

== Referral Partnerships ==
JCLA has over 70 referral partnerships with agencies that refer beneficiaries to JCLA's legal assistance services across 74 locations. These partnerships include government agencies (such as the Ministry of Justice, Ministry of Social Development, and Public Security Directorate) as well as and NGOs (such as the Norwegian Refugee Council, the Iraqi Refugee Assistance Program, Ruwwad and Tkiyet Um Ali).

== See also ==
- Access to Justice Initiatives
