= Mastabah Sub-district =

Mastabah
- Sub-district
- Country: Jordan
- Governorate: Jerash
- Time zone: GMT +2
  - Summer (DST): +3

Mastabah is one of the sub-districts of Qaṣabah Jarash district in Jerash governorate, Jordan.
