= Jarash Sub-district =

Jarash
- Sub-district
- Country: Jordan
- Governorate: Jerash
- Time zone: GMT +2
  - Summer (DST): +3

Jarash is one of the sub-districts of Qaṣabah Jarash district in Jerash governorate, Jordan.
