= Qaṣabah Jarash =

Governorate of Jordan

Qaṣabah Jarash قصبة جرش
- District
- Location within Jordan
- Coordinates: 32.25189°N 35.8705°E
- Country: Jordan
- Governorate: Jerash

Area
  - Total: 409.8 km^{2} (158.2 sq mi)

Population (2015)
  - Total: 237,059
  - Density: 578.5/km^{2} (1,498/sq mi)
- Time zone: GMT +2
  - Summer (DST): +3

Qaṣabah Jarash is the only district of Jerash Governorate in north Jordan. Covering approximately 409.8 km^{2} (158.2 sq mi), it had a population of 237,059 residents according to the 2015 census. It is further sub-divided into three sub-districts: Jarash, Mastabah, and Borma. The region has a Mediterranean climate with agriculture as the major economic activity.

== History ==
The history of Jerash region dates back to nearly 6500 years. It was part of the Decapolis, an alliance of ten cities, during the Roman Empire. Under the Roman rule, it was known as Gerasa, and it was later abandoned in the eighth century CE after an earthquake. Human settlement again started in the 12th century CE and the city was reestablished in the 19th century. The district of Qaṣabah Jarash was formalised in 1994 as part of Governorate-level administrative reforms.

== Geography ==
Qaṣabah Jarash is the only district of Jerash Governorate in north Jordan. It covers an area of approximately 409.8 km^{2} (158.2 sq mi). It is further sub-divided into three sub-districts: Jarash, Mastabah, and Borma. The region has a Mediterranean climate with hot summers and cold winters. It is surrounded by a few high mountains, which accumulate snow during the winters.

== Demographics and economy ==
Qasabah Jarash had a population of 237,059 residents according to the 2015 census. The economy is predominantly dependent on agriculture. The region has a number of oil mills, owing to the large production of olives. There are olive trees, which had existed for hundreds of years, since the Roman era. Fruits and cereals are also cultivated.

Jarash is a popular tourist destination due to milder weather compared to other regions of Jordan in the summer, and its Roman historical sites. The region is well connected with Amman by road. Local theatres host Roman chariot experience shows, and the annual Jerash Festival of Culture & Arts, established in 1981, features music, dance, poetry, and handicrafts.
