= 2021 arrests in Jordan =

Arrests for alleged attempted coup

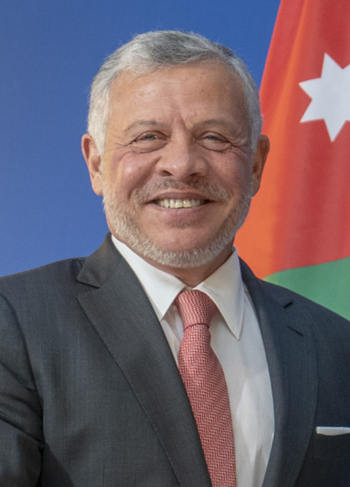
Abdullah II
King since 1999

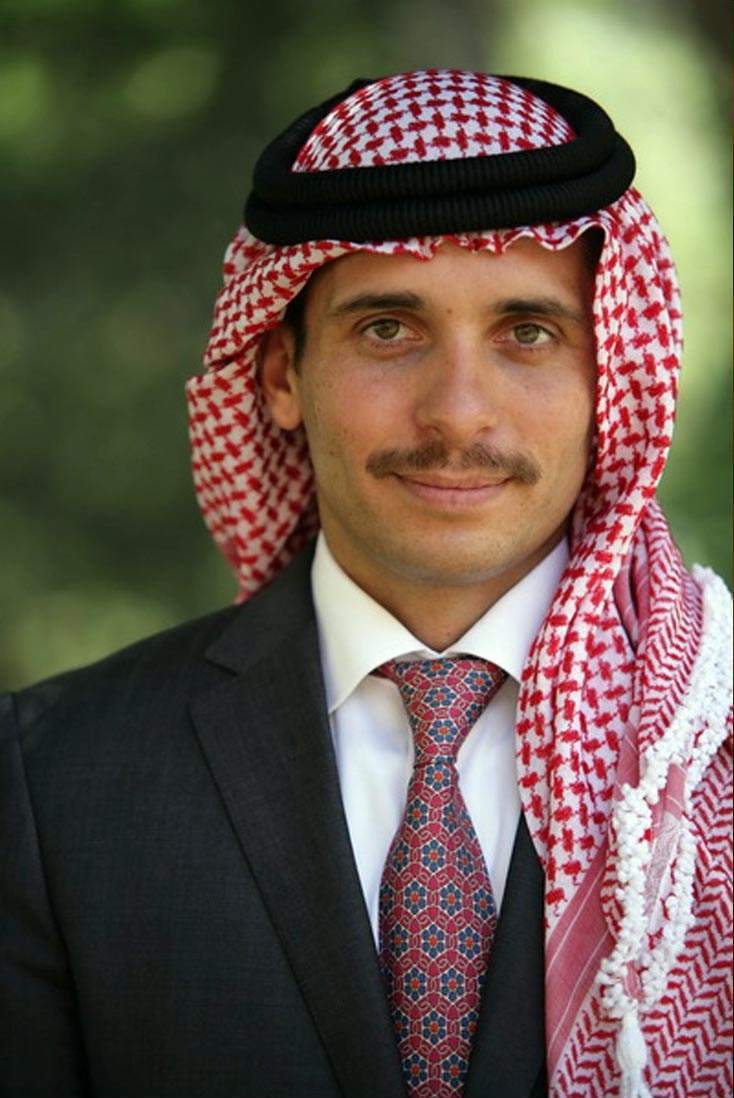
Hamzah
Crown prince, 1999–2004

On 3 April 2021, Jordanian authorities arrested 19 people, including Prince Hamzah, who was put under house arrest. Arrests also included the prince's chief of staff and other figures associated with him, in addition to a member of the royal family, Sharif Hassan bin Zaid, and Bassem Awadallah, former Chief of the Royal Hashemite Court and Jordan's former envoy to Saudi Arabia.

Hamzah is the son of the late King Hussein and the half-brother of the current king, Abdullah II. He was the country's crown prince from the death of his father in 1999 until he was stripped of his position by his half-brother the king in 2004.

== Background ==
Since the creation of the modern state of Jordan in 1921, the country has been ruled by the Hashemite dynasty. Jordan is a constitutional monarchy but the king holds wide executive and legislative powers; he may dismiss the parliament and prime minister at will, personal freedoms are curtailed, and there are frequent crackdowns on political opposition. Jordan has for decades been seen as a relatively stable country, avoiding the war and instability suffered by many of its regional neighbors, such as Iraq and Syria. Jordan is regionally influential; it is a close ally of the United States; a significant intermediary between the Israelis and Palestinians, and holds formal custodianship of Jerusalem's Al Aqsa Mosque.

During the life of King Hussein, his sons and his four wives engaged in prolonged struggles for influence. King Abdullah II ascended the throne in 1999 upon the death of his father, who named him as successor weeks before he died. Abdullah is the son of Princess Muna, Hussein's second wife. By contrast, Hamzah bin Hussein is the son of Queen Noor, Hussein's fourth wife (and thus Abdullah's younger half-brother). Both Abdullah and Hamzah were educated at elite schools in the United States and Britain. In 1999, King Abdullah named Hamzah as crown prince, but in 2004, Abdullah stripped Hamzah of the title, later granting it to his son Prince Hussein in 2009. In the years leading up to the 2021 events, Hamzah, a former brigadier-general in the Jordanian Army, sought to regain his influence and depicted himself as a dynamic anti-corruption figure. Hamzah was viewed as a popular figure who resembled his father, and was popular among Jordanian tribes. Tensions among the royal family had been apparent for some time, although control over the kingdom had not been publicly placed in question.

At the time of the 2021 events, Abdullah was 59, Hamzah was 41, and Prince Hussein was 26.

== Events ==
On 3 April 2021, Jordanian authorities announced that they arrested nearly 20 people for involvement in a plot targeting the country's security, while the former crown prince, Hamzah, was put under house arrest. Prince Hamzah's wife, Princess Basmah Hamzah, was also placed under house arrest for a period of a week. At that time, authorities accused Basmah of being in contact with a "person with links to foreign security services" to leave Jordan when the arrests began.

Jordanian officials stated that there was a complex and far-reaching plot that included at least one other Jordanian royal as well as tribal leaders and members of the country's political and security establishment.

Among those arrested were Bassem Awadallah and Sharif Hassan bin Zaid, two dual nationals holding both Jordanian and Saudi citizenships. Awadallah once served as head of the Jordanian Royal Court. He was also Jordan's former envoy to Saudi Arabia and was known for having close ties with the Saudi Crown Prince Mohammed bin Salman. Bassem Awadallah is a controversial figure in Jordan, criticized for the neoliberal economic policies that he supported during his positions in the government during the mid-2000s. Awadallah's and the Hashemite Sharif's alleged dual nationalities, holding both Jordanian and Saudi citizenships, were seen as potential links to foreign involvements. Despite being a member of the royal family, little information has been publicly revealed about Sharif Hassan bin Zaid. Zaid's Hashemite father, Sharif Hasan Ibn Zayd Al Nasser, also lives in Saudi Arabia.

The Guardian reported that Jordanian intelligence was alerted to the sedition plot when Bin Zaid "approached a US diplomat soliciting support for the former crown prince’s ascent to the throne". It was further reported that intercepted recordings to tribal leaders revealed communications that Hamzah had "made a decision to move", and asking that leaders "pledge allegiance" to Hamzah. Audio recordings of Hamzah and Bin Zaid discussing plans were leaked to Twitter.

The event marked a very rare public rift among Jordan's royal family. Queen Noor, the stepmother of King Abdullah II and the widow of King Hussein, described the arrest of her son as the result of "wicked slander" and said that she was "praying that truth and justice will prevail".

=== Alleged foreign involvement ===
The Jordanian Government stated that there was foreign backing for the plan.

Journalist Smadar Perry with Yediot Aharonot alleged that the plotters were backed by Saudi Crown Prince Mohammad bin Salman and Abu Dhabi Crown Prince Mohammed bin Zayed Al Nahyan based on information received from a very high-ranking source in Jordan.

Roy Shaposhnik, an Israeli businessman and friend of Hamzah, said that he had offered use of a private jet to Hamzah's wife Basmah and children to allow them to flee Jordan to his home in Europe. Ammon, a Jordanian media site linked to Jordanian intelligence, said that Shaposhnik was formerly part of Mossad, which Shaposhnik denied. It is reported that Shaposhnik did previously work with Erik Prince, and was also previously linked politically with Ehud Olmert. However, Shaposhnik stated his offer of assistance was based only on his "close personal friend[ship]" with Hamzah and Hamzah's family.

Former Deputy Prime Minister Jawad Anani claimed Israel was the foreign country involved in the plot. According to some sources, during the trial of Awadhallah and Bin Zaid, "prosecutors reportedly claimed [Hamzah] said Jerusalem was “not one of his priorities at this time” and would be more pliable than Abdullah regarding Palestinian-Israeli peace". At the time, this would have been in the interest of Israel.

Further, Hamzah allegedly sought assurances from Awadhallah that he would receive assistance from Saudi if "something happens" to him in Jordan.

Dr. Bessma Momani, Professor of Political Science at the University of Waterloo, wrote; "The notion that there are foreign elements to the Jordan/Prince Hamza saga is a distraction. Jordanian & Israeli intelligence & military have a strong working relationship".

=== Aftermath ===
The Jordanian Armed Forces issued a warning against Hamzah to halt actions targeting "security and stability" in the kingdom. On 5 April 2021, Hamzah, while in house arrest, released video and audio recordings saying that he would not comply with the military's orders not to use Twitter or otherwise communicate with the outside world. He said that "[F]or sure I won't obey when they tell you that you cannot go out or tweet or reach out to people but are only allowed to see the family. I expect this talk is not acceptable in any way." Hamza also accused the government of a "breakdown in governance" as well as corruption, nepotism, and incompetence.

On the same day the Royal Hashemite Court issued a statement saying that King Abdullah had decided "to deal with the topic of His Highness Prince Hamzeh within the framework of the Hashemite family" and that Prince Hassan bin Talal, the uncle of Abdullah and Hamzeh, would serve as a mediator. The statement also said that Hamzeh "confirmed that he is committed to the Hashemite family's approach and the path King Abdullah entrusted his uncle with."

Later the same day, after meeting with Hassan, Hamzah signed a letter reaffirming his allegiance and loyalty to Abdullah, writing, "In light of the developments of the past two days I put myself in the hands of the king, following the steps of my forefathers." The move appeared to de-escalate the family feud.

On 7 April 2021, King Abdullah II spoke publicly for the first time since the alleged coup and hinted that the Jordanian royal feud was over, stating that the "sedition" that caused him "pain and anger" had been quashed and that Hamzah was now "in his palace under my protection." Abdullah also stated that the crisis began with Jordan's military chief of staff visiting Hamzah and then warned him to stop attending meetings with critics of the government.

In building the prosecution cases against the accused the focus was on key phone call recordings.

In April 2022, Hamzah relinquished his royal title of prince, stating his "personal convictions" were not in line with "the approaches, trends and modern methods of our institutions". A month earlier, he had reportedly apologized to the King in a letter, wishing to "turn the page on this chapter in our country's and our family's history". In May 2022, the King formally announced that Hamzah had been put under house arrest and his communications and movements were limited due to his "erratic behavior and aspirations".

== International reactions ==
Saudi Arabia, the United Arab Emirates, Egypt, Lebanon, Qatar, Turkey, Iran, Iraq, Greece, Tunisia, Morocco, the Arab League, Palestine, Russia, France, the United Kingdom and the United States all voiced support for King Abdullah II.

Israeli Defense Minister Benny Gantz called the developments in Jordan an "internal" issue. Iran's foreign ministry said that Iran opposed "the internal instability in Jordan and any foreign involvement" and blamed Israel for "all attempted rebellions in Islamic countries."

== See also ==
- 1957 alleged Jordanian military coup attempt
- Black September
