= National Centre for Human Rights (Jordan) =

National human rights institution

The National Centre for Human Rights
- المركز الوطني لحقوق الإنسان
- Formation: 2006
- Type: Non-profit
- Purpose: Human Rights
- Headquarters: Amman (Jordan)
- President: Dr Mohammed Adnan Albakhit
- Vice-President: Dr Saad Hijazi
- Commissioner General: Dr Musa Burayzat
- Website: Official website

The National Centre for Human Rights (NCHR; Arabic: المركز الوطني لحقوق الإنسان, romanized: al-Markaz al-Waṭanī li-Ḥuqūq al-Insān) is the national human rights institution of Jordan.

In 2006 the NCHR secured 'A-status' accreditation from the peer review process of the International Coordinating Committee of NHRIs (ICC), certifying it as compliant with the Paris Principles (the UN-endorsed standards for NHRIs). This gave it enhanced access to the United Nations human rights bodies. That status was subjected to special review twice by the ICC in 2007, and reaffirmed; it was again accorded A status under the ordinary review procedure in 2010.

In the ICC annual meeting in March 2012, the Jordanian institution was elected as chair of the network of 99 institutions.

The commission is a member of the Asia Pacific Forum, one of the four regional groupings in the ICC.

The NCHR also launches investigations due to complaints of human rights abuse in the correction centers in Jordan.

== History ==
King Abdullah II established a Royal Commission for Human Rights in 2000 to examine Jordan's human rights situation. In 2002, the Royal Commission for Human Rights completed its mandate, recommending the establishment of an independent national human rights organization to improve the Kingdom's protection and respect of human rights. Following that, in 2002, the NCHR was formed by a provisional law (no. 75) under Article 94(1) of the Constitution of Jordan by a Royal Decree on December 19, 2002. It was subsequently made permanent by the Law of the National Centre for Human Human Rights (Permanent Law No 51, 2006). In carrying out its human rights-related activities, the NCHR has a nationwide jurisdiction with complete budgetary and administrative independence.

== Leadership and structure ==
The Commissioner General of the NCHR is Dr Mousa Burayzat.

As per Articles 13 of the NCHR Law No (51), the NCHR is run by a board of trustees, which is responsible for the organization's policy, activities, and spending. The board is made up of 21 qualified experts from various professions and backgrounds who appropriately reflect the various groups in society and are active in human rights protection and promotion. Representatives of civil society organizations, trade unions and professional associations, the legal and health sectors, academia, parliament, and government make up the board of trustees. The board of trustees is also intended to have balanced representation of gender. The centre's executive body is the Secretariat, which is led by the Commissioner General, who oversees and supervises the centre. In addition to a media and outreach office, the Secretariat is made up of two commissions (Enhancing Rights and Public Freedom Commission and Legislation Commission) and 10 divisions.

== See also ==
- Correction centers in Jordan
- Human rights in Jordan
- National human rights institutions
- Paris Principles
