= Balila =

Balila بليلا
- Town
- Location within Jordan
- Coordinates: 32°23′5″N 35°55′57″E
- Grid position: 238/199
- Country: Jordan
- Province: Jerash Governorate
- Municipality established: 1927

Government
  - Type: Municipality
  - Mayor: Magableh

Population (2007)
  - Total: 12,000
- Time zone: GMT +2
  - Summer (DST): +3
- Area code: +(962)2

Balila (Arabic: بليلا) is a town in far northwest Jordan, between Irbid and Jerash located in the Jerash Governorate. It covers 40 km², and has a population of over 8,000.

== Name ==
Balila is Turkish for "high point". It is located at the foot of the mountains bordering Syria known as Huran, which translates to "flat ad green land".

== History ==
Balila is located near the border of Syria and Occupied Jordaninas and some Syrian refugees. The Roman Empire utilized Balila as a remote hub to link their colonies.

In 1838 Balila was noted as being in ruins.

The Jordanian census of 1961 found 761 inhabitants in Balila.

== Economy ==
Balila's economy relies on local commerce and farming.

== Culture ==
Balila is a small quiet town in Jerash, the people there are known for achieving higher education levels (the majority of Ph.D. degrees). In other towns in Jordan around 40% of capital employees work in Jordan military and 40% in education jobs. Balila Consist of seven families all of them migrate from another town in Jerash called Migbelah, so people around Balila call the Magableh in connection to their original town. The Magableh family originated from the famous tribe Banu Tamim which had a great impact on the Arab world. These families are Aloqaily, Bani-Mousa, Okahsat, Masalha, Al-Gablan, and Alkawnah. All of them back to one grandfather. The total population is about 8,000-10,000 people. In the days of Othman's Khilafat and until the mid-1980s, the people of Balila worked in their farms after that they start higher education evolution, as a result of that 65% of the population hold a university degree, and 85% of those born after 1980 hold the first degree, many of them holding also the second degree and the doctoral degree.

== Bibliography ==
- Government of Jordan, Department of Statistics (1964). First Census of Population and Housing. Volume I: Final Tables; General Characteristics of the Population (PDF).
- Robinson, E.; Smith, E. (1841). Biblical Researches in Palestine, Mount Sinai and Arabia Petraea: A Journal of Travels in the year 1838. Vol. 3. Boston: Crocker & Brewster.
