= Bassem Awadallah =

Jordanian politician

Bassem I. Awadallah
- باسم عوض الله
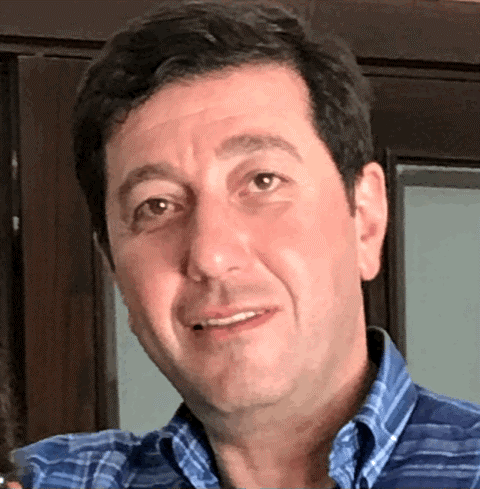
- Born: December 21, 1964 (age 61); Jerusalem
- Citizenship: United States of America
- Education: Georgetown University; The London School of Economics and Political Science

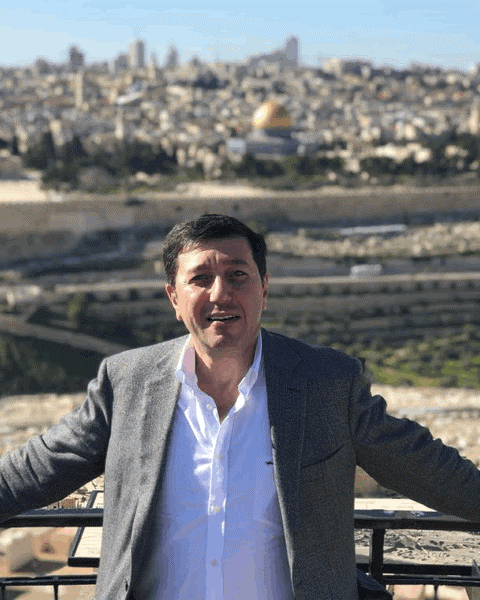
Bassem I. Awadallah in Jerusalem

Bassem I. Awadallah (Arabic: باسم عوض الله; born in 1964) is a Jordanian public figure. He is the chief executive officer of Tomoh Advisory, based in Dubai, UAE and serves as a member of the board of directors of Al Baraka Banking Group in Bahrain. In 2006 Awadallah was appointed as the director of the Office of King Abdullah II and was appointed chief of the Royal Hashemite Court of Jordan in 2007.

Awadallah was chosen as a Lee Kuan Yew Fellow, in Singapore in 2004, and a Young Global Leader by the World Economic Forum in 2005. He is the recipient of the Al Hussein Decoration for Distinguished Service, the Al Kawkab Decoration of the First Order, and the Al Istiqlal Decoration of the First Order, of the Hashemite Kingdom of Jordan.

== Early life and education ==
Awadallah is a United States citizen who was born in Jerusalem in 1964. He received his bachelor's degree in Foreign Service from Georgetown University, Washington, D.C., in 1984. He also holds a master's degree (1985) and Ph.D (1988) from The London School of Economics and Political Science, University of London.

== Career ==
Awadallah worked in the Investment Banking field primarily in the United Kingdom, from 1986 until 1992. He was then appointed as the economic secretary to the Prime Minister of Jordan from 1992 until 1996. He then served as the economic advisor to the Prime Minister of Jordan until 1999, after which he held the position of director of the Economic Department at the Royal Hashemite Court until 2001. In 2001, he became the minister of planning and international cooperation until 2005. From April to June 2005 he served as the minister of finance. In 2006, Awadallah served as the director of the Office of King Abdullah II and then chief of the Royal Hashemite Court from 2007 until 2008.

In 2001, Awadallah was appointed as a member of the board of trustees in the King Hussein Cancer Center in Jordan until 2013. From 2002 until 2008 he was the vice-chairman of the King Abdullah II Fund for Development. In 2008, he was appointed as a member of the Board of Directors of the Dubai School of Government. In 2010, he was a visiting fellow at the Oxford Centre for Islamic Studies at Oxford University, United Kingdom. In 2011, he was appointed as a member of the Advisory Board of the Middle East Centre, of the London School of Economics and Political Science of the University of London. In 2010, Awadallah was appointed as secretary general of the Islamic Chamber of Commerce and Industry and as a member of the Advisory Board of Standard Chartered Bank for the MENA region. In May 2014, he was appointed as a member of the Board of Trustees of Al Quds University in Palestine.

== Arrest ==
On 3 April 2021, Awadallah was reportedly arrested by the Jordanian Government, along with other high ranking figures.

The day after his arrest, a diplomatic delegation from Saudi Arabia arrived in Amman formally to stand in "full solidarity" with Jordan and supports all decisions and measures taken by King Abdullah II. The Washington Post claimed they requested the release of Awadullah. In the past Awadullah was a special envoy to Saudi Arabia sent by King Abdullah II, during which time he was granted a Saudi passport. The Saudi insistence on Awadullah's immediate release — before any judicial process or the filing of formal charges — gives the appearance that the Saudis are worried about what he might say. The Saudi foreign ministry denied the claims and responded to the CNN investigation about the issue that "The minister [Prince Faisal Bin Farhan] was in Amman to confirm solidarity and support of the Kingdom of Saudi Arabia for the Kingdom of Jordan", and that "the minister did not discuss any other issues or submit any requests."
