= Jerash Governorate =

Governorate of Jordan

Coordinates: 32.2769°N 35.9056°E

Jerash Governorate محافظة جرش Jarash Governorate
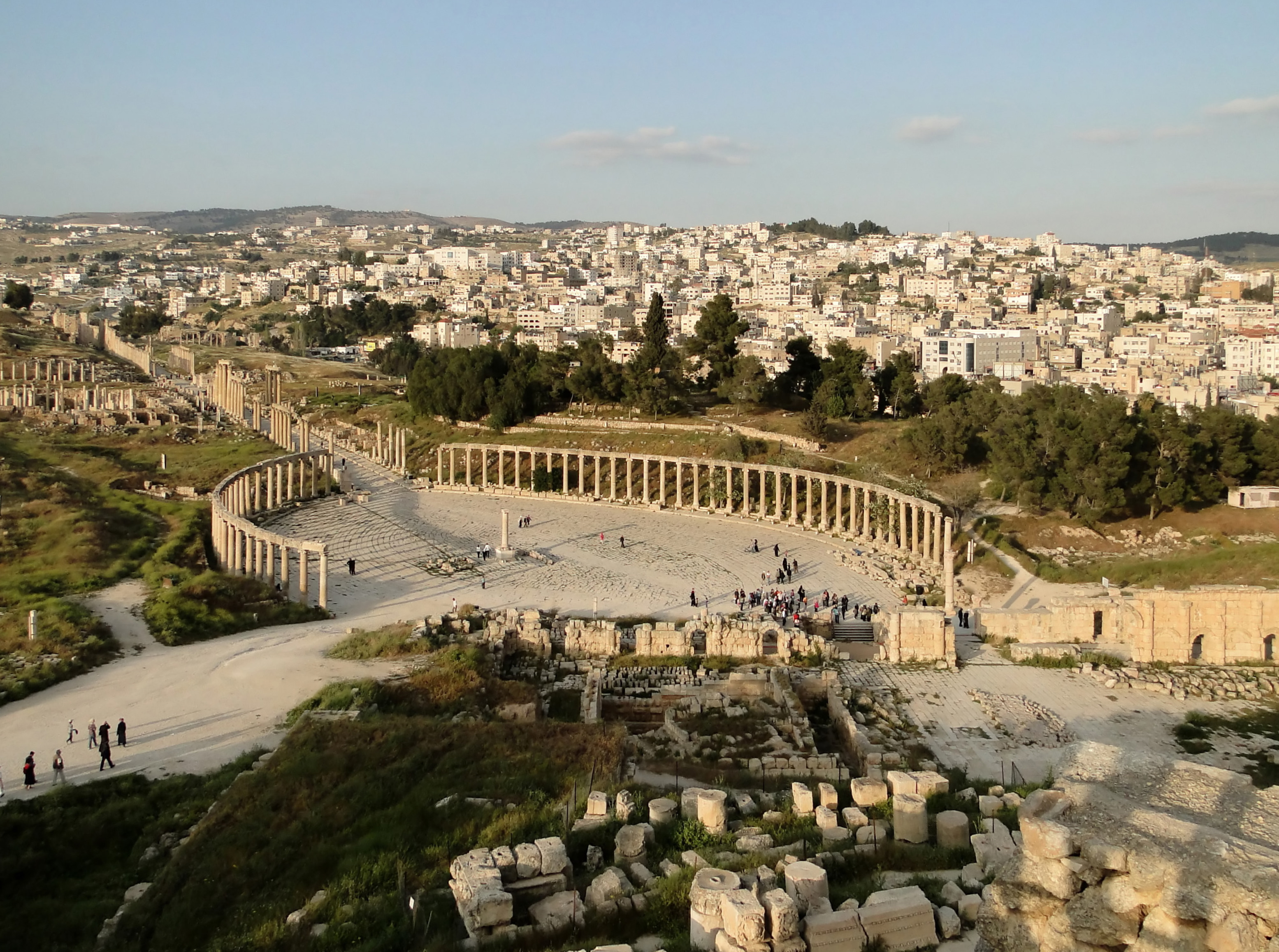
- The city of Jerash is the capital of Jerash Governorate

- Location of Jerash Governorate in Jordan
- Country: Jordan
- Capital: Jerash

Government
  - Governor: Firas Faour

Area
  - Total: 410 km^{2} (160 sq mi)

Population (2015)
  - Total: 237,000
  - Density: 580/km^{2} (1,500/sq mi)
- Time zone: GMT +2
  - Summer (DST): +3
- Area code: +(962)2
- HDI (2021): 0.715 high · 5th of 12

Jerash Governorate (Arabic: محافظة جرش) is one of 12 governorates in Jordan. It is located in the northwestern side of the country. The capital of the governorate is the city of Jerash.

Jerash Governorate has the smallest area of the 12 governorates of Jordan, yet it has the second highest density in Jordan after Irbid Governorate. Jerash Governorate is ranked 7th by population.

== History ==
In the first century of the Christian era this insignificant city (then Gerasa) experienced a fast ascent under Roman rule and the Pax Romana. It became part of the Decapolis and grew increasingly competitive with the older Petra as a commercial town. The inhabitants extracted iron ore from the nearby Ajlun mountains. Starting in the middle of the 1st century, this upswing led to active building and a rich abundance of architectural monuments, still impressive today. In the 2nd century, the Roman expansion wars in Asia led to further gains. Well-made roads were built to Pella, Philadelphia (now Amman), Dion and to the provincial capital Bos(t)ra. Emperor Hadrian visited the city in the winter of 129-130. In the following centuries the political situation in this region changed fundamentally and the city's means declined. During this time also Christianity was on the ascendant and many churches were built. Gerasa had its own bishop—still today it is a Titularbistum—and bishop Placcus (or Plancus) participated in the Council of Chalcedon.

The mathematician Nicomachus of Gerasa came from this city.

The Jerash Governorate was formed in 1994 from a portion of Irbid Governorate.

== Geography ==
The province is bordered by Irbid Governorate to the north, Ajlun Governorate to the west, Mafraq Governorate and Zarqa Governorate to the east, and Amman and Balqa Governorate to the south.

The average yearly rainfall in the governorate is in the range of 400–600 mm considered among the highest in the country. The elevation range of the province is 300 to 1247 m above sea level with fresh water streams and the Zarqa River flowing through it. The province is a mountainous area with a mild mediterranean climate.

== Administrative divisions ==
Jerash Governorate consists of a single district (liwa'), Jerash Liwa, that is divided into three sub-districts (qda'):

1. Jarash Sub-district
2. Mastabah Sub-district
3. Borma Sub-district

=== Cities and towns ===
Aside from the city of Jerash that gives the governorate its name, the governorate has many cities and towns: Souf, Sakib, Borma, Al-Mastaba, El-Kitté, Al-Haddadé, Bellila, Deir Il-Liyat, Nahlé, Il-Kfeir, Rashaida, Raimoun, An-Nabi Houd, Al-Jazzazah, Jubbah, Mirse', Muqbila, Al-Msheirfeh, Qafqafa, and others.

=== Refugee camps ===
There are two Palestinian refugee camps in Jerash Governorate, Souf camp near Souf and Gaza (Jerash) camp at Al Ḩaddādah.

== Demographics ==
The national census of 2015 shows that the population of Jerash Governorate was 237,059 making up 2.49% of the population of Jordan. Around 70,000 were non-citizens, a figure including refugees. This number is an increase by 54% on the population of the governorate in 2004, which was 153,602. Jordanian nationals made up 70.7% of the population in 2015. The foreign nationals who reside in Jerash Governorate made up only 2.38% of the foreign nationals in Jordan.

The population in 2004 was distributed as follows:

No	Information	Jerash Governorate (2004)	Jordan (2004)
1	Total population	153,602	5,350,000
2	Growth rate	2.1%	2.3%
3	Male to female ratio	51.48 to 48.52	51.5 to 48.5
4	Ratio of Jordanians to foreign nationals	87.1 to 12.9	93.0 to 7.0
5	Persons per household	5.9	5.3
6	Population 15 years of age or older	52%	56%

The population of districts according to census results:

District	Population (Census 1994)	Population (Census 2004)	Population (Census 2015)
Jerash Governorate	123,190	153,602	237,059
Qaṣabah Jarash	123,190	153,602	237,059

== Economy ==
The governorate's economy largely depends on commerce and tourism. Jerash is the second favorite tourist destination in Jordan. In addition to the historical sites, the governorate is also known for its forests that attract tourists. The governorate is also a main source of the highly educated and skilled workforce in Jordan. Jerash is equidistant (40 km) from the largest three cities in Jordan (Amman, Irbid and Zarqa), and this proximity makes the governorate a good business location. In addition, the province accounts of about 12% of olive oil production in Jordan.

== Education ==
Jerash Governorate has two universities; Jerash Private University and Philadelphia University.

== Gallery ==
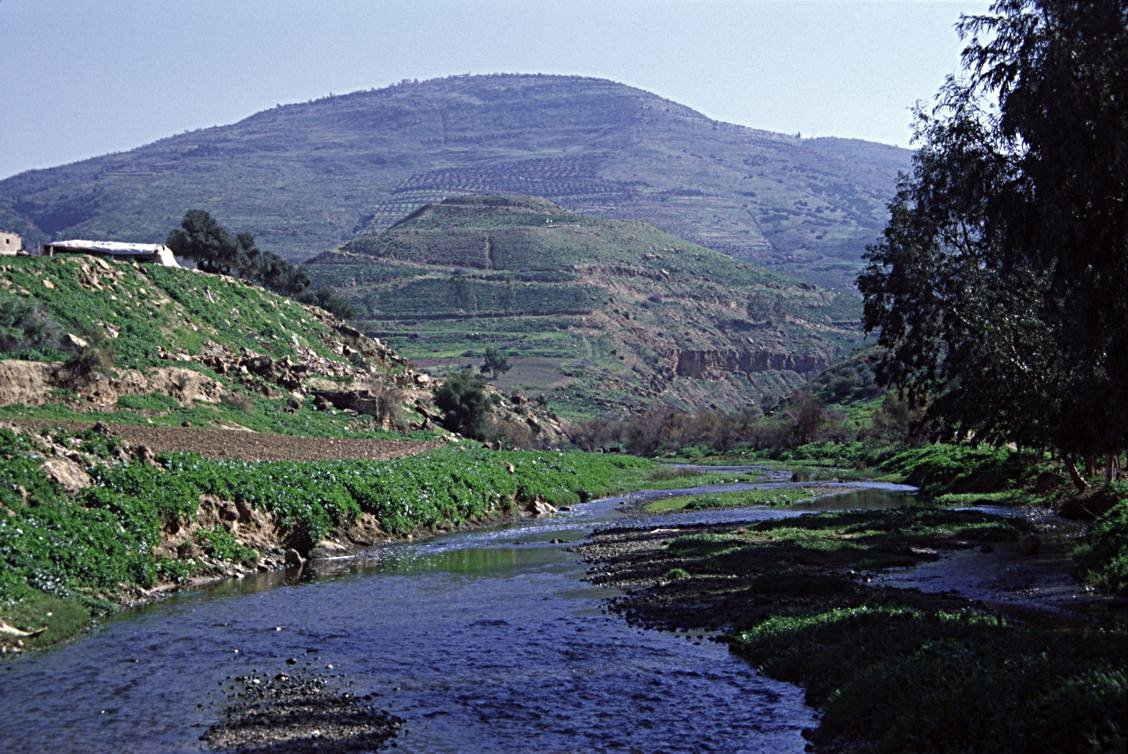
Zarqa River passing through the governorate

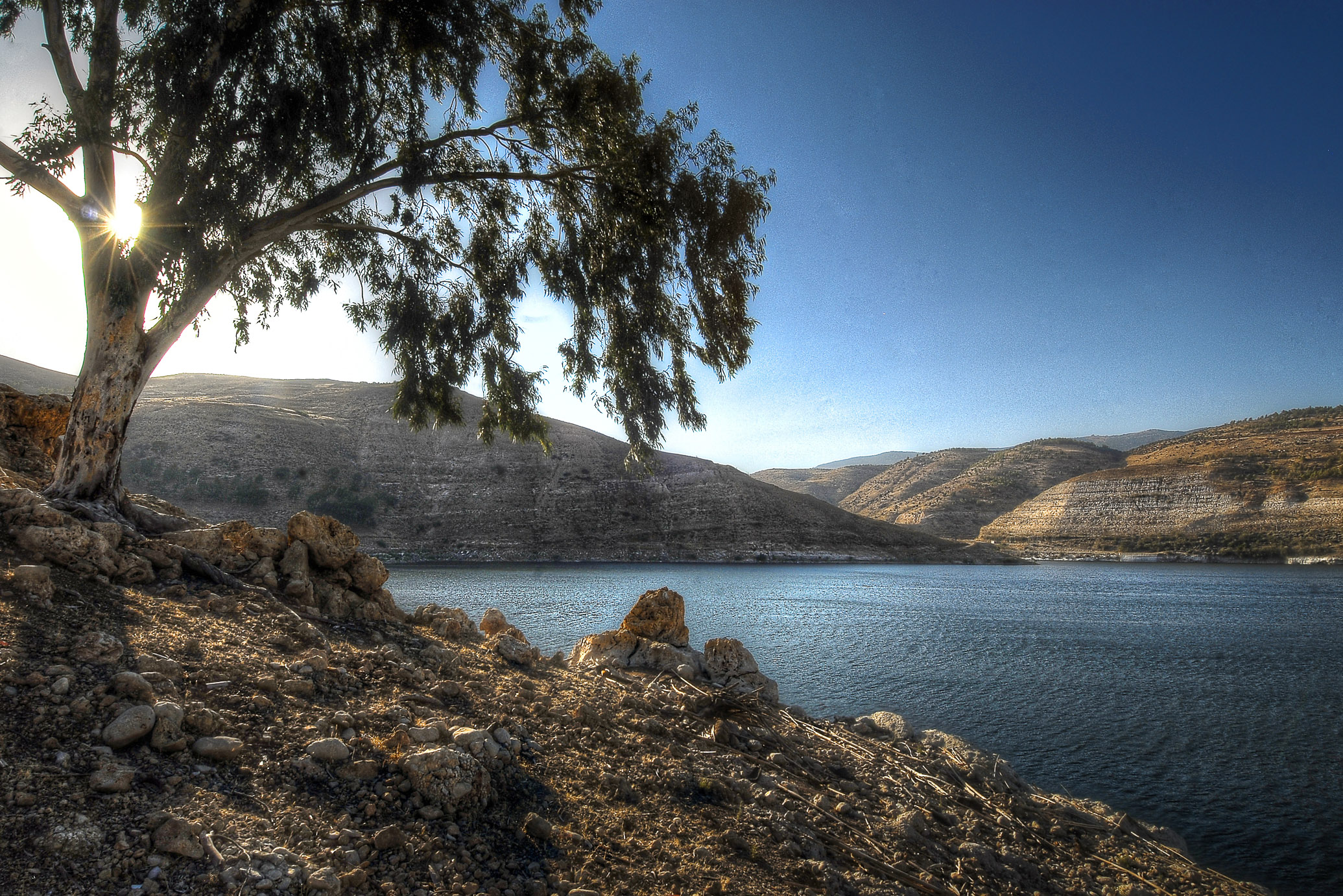
King Talal Dam

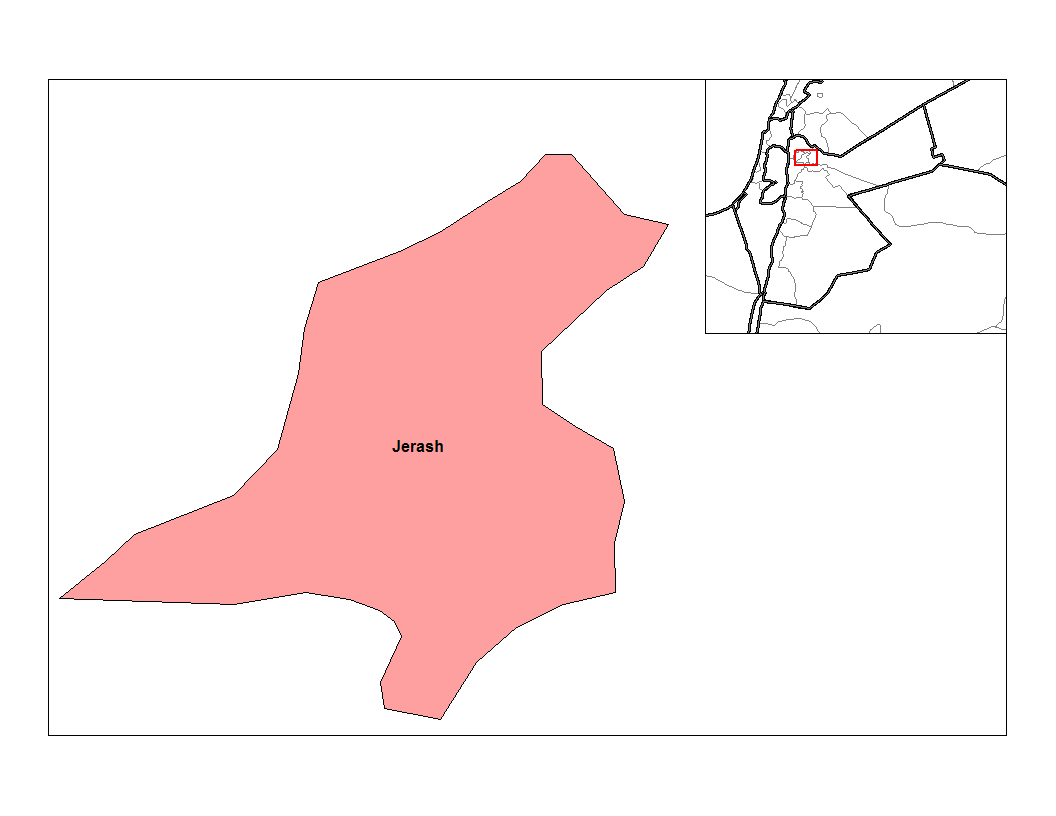
Map of the governorate

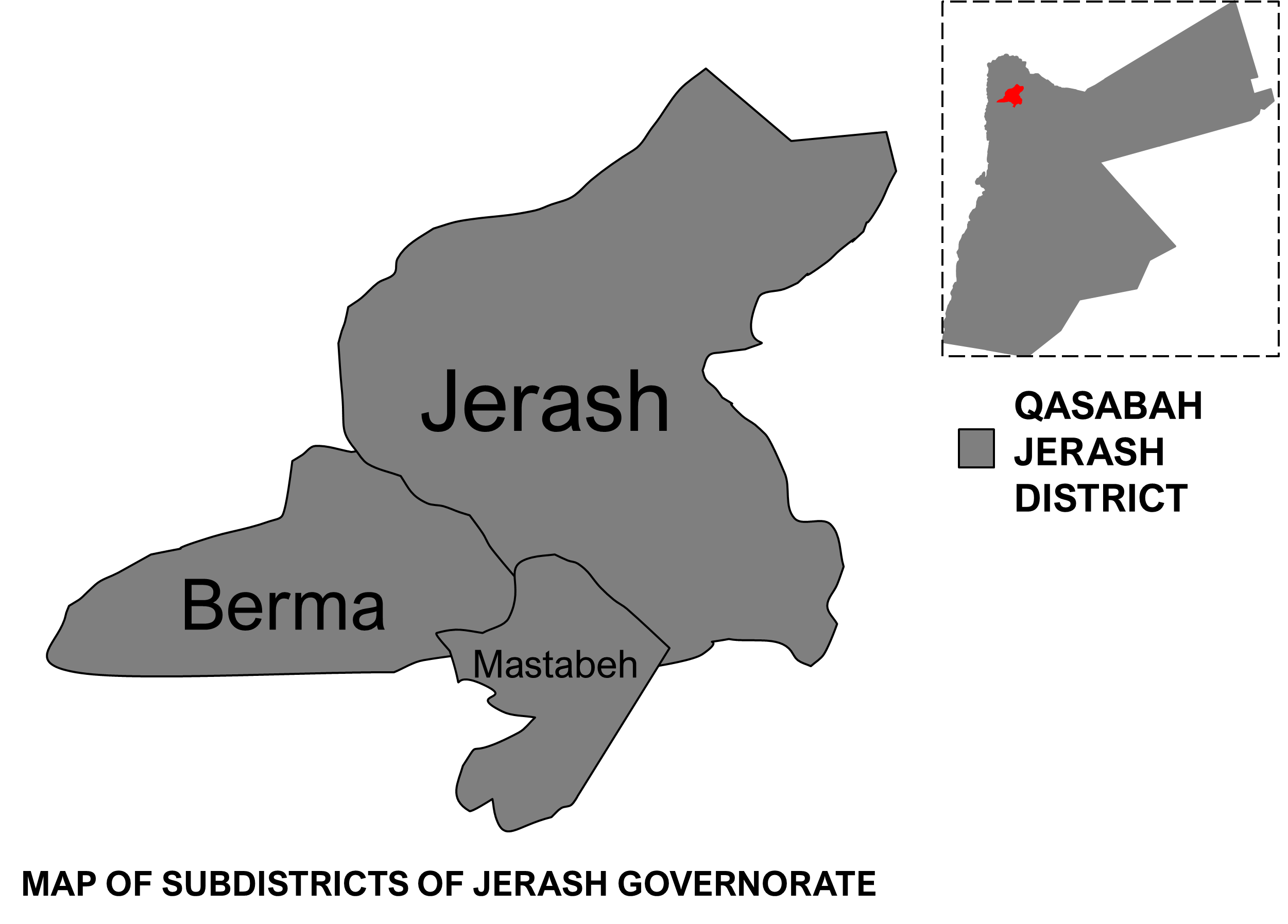
Jerash Subdistrict Map
