= Hamzah bin Hussein =

Jordanian royal (born 1980)

Hamzah bin Al Hussein حمزة بن الحسين
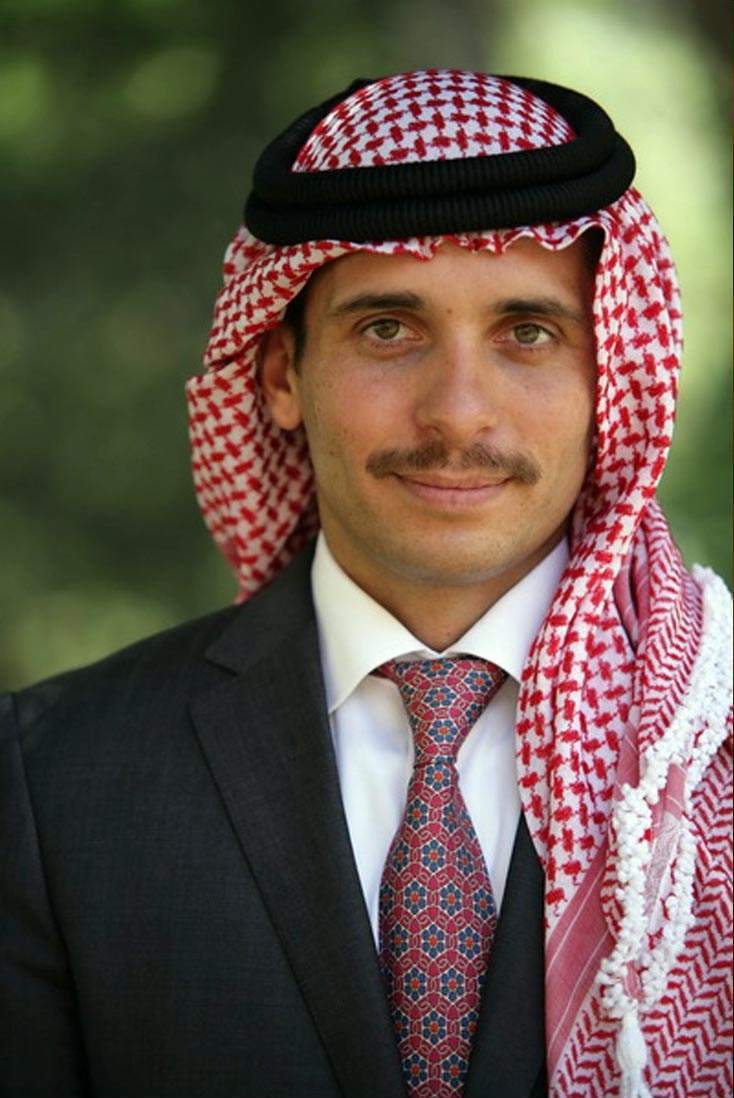
- Hamzah in 2017

Crown Prince of Jordan
- Tenure: 7 February 1999 – 28 November 2004
- Monarch: Abdullah II of Jordan
- Predecessor: Prince Abdullah (later Abdullah II)
- Successor: Prince Hussein (in 2009)
- Born: 29 March 1980 (age 46); King Hussein Medical Center, Amman, Jordan
- Spouse: Princess Noor bint Asem of Jordan (m. 2003; div. 2009) Basmah Bani Ahmad Al-Outom (m. 2012)
- Issue: Princess Haya; Princess Zein; Princess Noor; Princess Badiya; Princess Nafisa; Prince Hussein; Prince Muhammad
Names
- Hamzah bin Hussein bin Talal bin Abdullah
- House: Hashemite
- Father: Hussein of Jordan
- Mother: Lisa Halaby
- Military career
- Allegiance: Jordan
- Branch: Royal Jordanian Army
- Service years: 1999–present
- Rank: Brigadier

Hamzah bin Al Hussein OSJ (Arabic: حمزة بن الحسين; born 29 March 1980) is the fourth son of King Hussein of Jordan overall and the first by his American-born fourth wife, Queen Noor. He was named Crown Prince of Jordan on 7 February 1999, a position he held until his older half-brother, King Abdullah II, rescinded it on 28 November 2004. He is a member of the Hashemite dynasty, the royal family of Jordan since 1921, and is a 41st-generation direct descendant of Muhammad.

Hamzah is reputed to be under house arrest since April 2021, after being accused of attempting to destabilise the Kingdom of Jordan and fomenting unrest. Hamzah officially renounced his title as prince in April 2022.

== Biography ==
Prince Hamzah was born on 29 March 1980 at King Hussein Medical Center in Wadi Al-Seer, Amman, Hamzah bin Al Hussein claims ancestry with the Islamic prophet Muhammad through the Hashemite family. Queen Noor states in her autobiography that she and King Hussein named Hamzah after Hamza ibn Abd al-Muttalib.

Hamzah received his elementary education in Jordan and Amman, and then attended Harrow School in England. He then joined the Royal Military Academy Sandhurst, passing out as a commissioned officer in the Jordan Arab Legion in December 1999, with a number of prizes including the Sandhurst Overseas Sword, granted to the best overseas cadet and the HRH Prince Saud Abdullah Prize, presented to the cadet with the best aggregate mark in academic subjects.

Serving then as an officer in the Jordan Arab Army's 40th Armored Brigade, Hamzah attended a number of military courses and attachments in Jordan, the UK, Poland, Germany and the US. Currently holding the rank of Brigadier in the Jordan Arab Army, he served with the Jordan-United Arab Emirates force operating in former Yugoslavia under the umbrella of international peacekeepers. In the year 2006, he graduated from Harvard University.

Hamzah was sworn in as Regent on numerous occasions and deputized for King Abdullah II on a number of missions in the Kingdom and abroad. He headed the Royal Advisory Committee on the Energy Sector. He is also the Honorary President of the Jordan Basketball Federation, and is the chairman of the board of trustees of the Royal Automobile Museum, the President of the Royal Aero sports Club of Jordan and the President of Al-Shajarah (Tree) Protection Society.

Hamzah is a qualified rotor and fixed wing aircraft pilot, and participates in other sports such as Jujitsu and target-shooting.

== Succession issue ==
On 7 February 1999, King Hussein died and his eldest son Prince Abdullah bin Al Hussein ascended to the throne of Jordan, having two weeks previously been designated to succeed his father as ruler in place of the king's brother, Crown Prince Hassan bin Talal. On the same day, in compliance with his father's wish, King Abdullah II decreed that he, in turn, would be succeeded not by a son of his own but by his half-brother, Hamzah, who was therefore accorded the title of crown prince.

Nearly six years later, on 28 November 2004, King Abdullah removed Hamzah as crown prince. In a letter from Abdullah to Hamzah, read on Jordanian state television, he declared the following:

"Your holding this symbolic position has restrained your freedom and hindered our entrusting you with certain responsibilities that you are fully qualified to undertake."

No successor to the title was named at the time. Abdullah II confirmed that his son Hussein would succeed him by designating him as crown prince on 2 July 2009.

== House arrest ==
On 3 April 2021, the BBC published a video of Hamzah in which he reported that he has been placed under house arrest as part of a crackdown on critics. It was stated that the video had been passed to the BBC through Hamzah's lawyer. On 7 April 2021, King Abdullah II publicly hinted that his tension with Hamzah, who had pledged loyalty to him two days after his house arrest began, was ending and that Hamzah was now "in his palace under my protection." Abdullah also stated that the crisis which resulted in Hamzah's house arrest started when Jordan's military chief of staff visited Hamzah and warned him to stop attending meetings with critics of the government. It was reported that Hamzah did not have the military or international support to launch a military coup. As such, some sources reported that the "sedition" was not a planned military coup, but rather a plan "to push for protests that would appear to be a popular uprising with masses on the street", which would subsequently pressure Abdullah to abdicate in Hamzah's favour.

In April 2022, Hamzah relinquished his royal title of prince, stating his "personal convictions" were not in line with "the approaches, trends and modern methods of our institutions". A month earlier, he had reportedly apologized to the King in a letter, wishing to "turn the page on this chapter in our country's and our family's history". In May 2022, the King formally announced that Hamzah had been put under house arrest and his communications and movements were limited due to his "erratic behavior and aspirations".

== Marriages and family ==
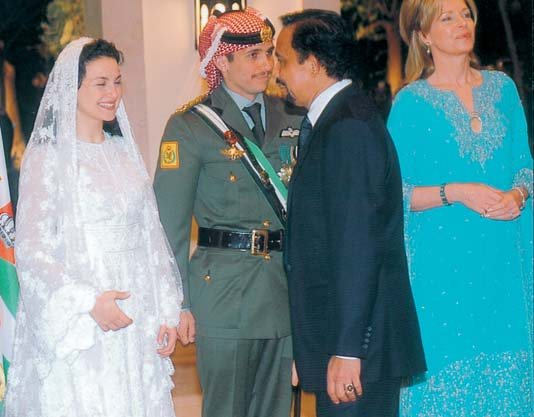
Hamzah and his first wife Noor (left) greeting the Sultan of Brunei on their wedding day, 2004

Hamzah married his second cousin, Princess Noor bint Asem bin Nayef, at Al—Baraka Palace of Amman on 29 August 2003. The wedding ceremony (zifaf) was held on 27 May 2004 at Zahran Palace. Hamzah and Noor divorced on 9 September 2009. The couple have one daughter:

- Princess Haya bint Hamzah (born 18 April 2007).

On 12 January 2012, Hamzah married Basmah Bani Ahmad Al-Outom. The couple have four daughters and two sons:

- Princess Zein bint Hamzah (born 3 November 2012)
- Princess Noor bint Hamzah (born 5 July 2014)
- Princess Badiya bint Hamzah (born 8 April 2016)
- Princess Nafisa bint Hamzah (born 7 February 2018)
- Prince Hussein bin Hamzah (born 8 November 2019)
- Prince Muhammad bin Hamzah (born 8 February 2022)

== Honours ==
=== National ===
- Jordan:
  - Knight Grand Cordon (Special Class) of the Supreme Order of the Renaissance
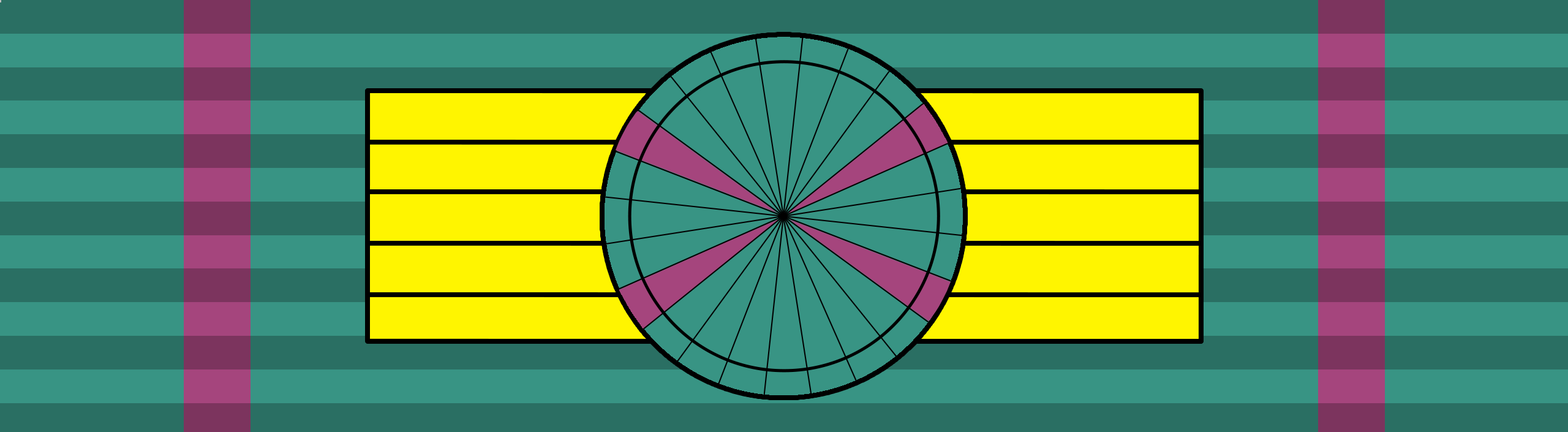
  - Knight Grand Cordon of the Order of the Star of Jordan
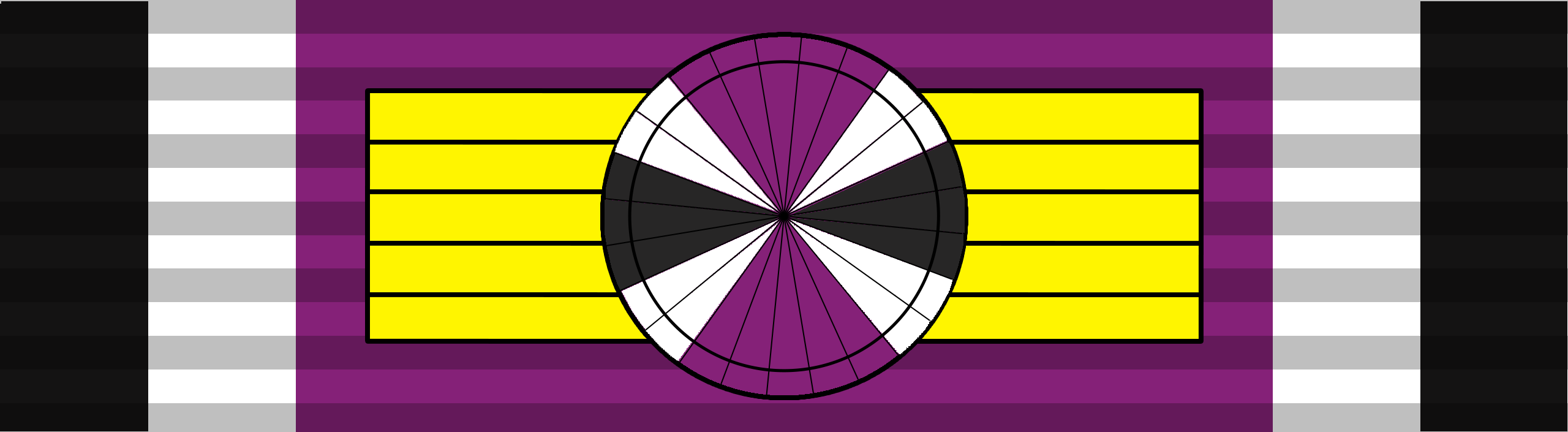
  - Knight Grand Cordon of the Order of Independence
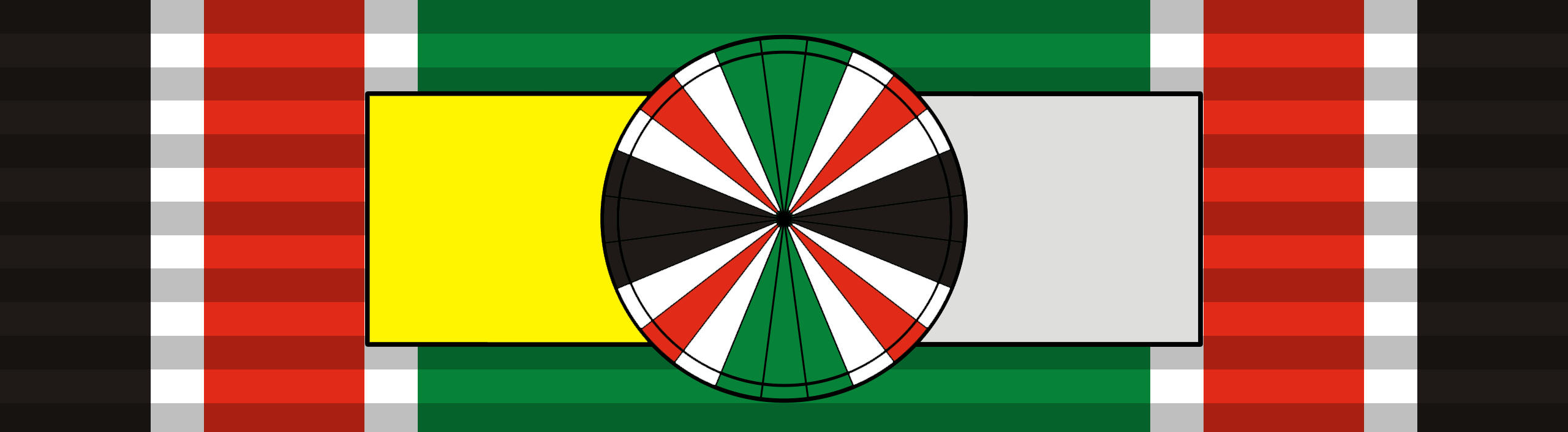
  - Knight Officer of the Order of Military Merit

=== Foreign ===
- Bahrain:
  - Recipient of the Medal of Ahmad Al-Fateh
- Italy:
  - Knight Grand Cross of the Order of Merit of the Italian Republic
- Norway:
  - Knight Grand Cross of the Order of Saint Olav
- The Netherlands:
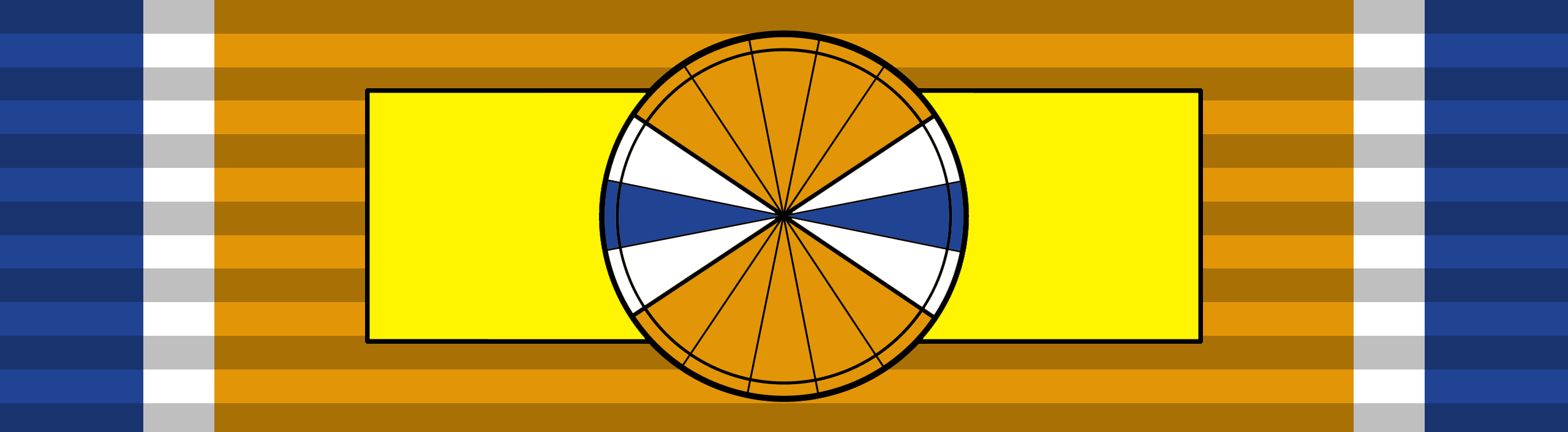
  - Knight Grand Cross of the Order of Orange-Nassau

Royal titles
Preceded by Abdullah bin Al Hussein	Crown Prince of Jordan; 1999–2004	Succeeded by Hussein bin Abdullah
Lines of succession
Preceded by Prince Abdullah bin Ali	Line of succession to the Jordanian throne 8th position	Succeeded by Prince Hashim bin Al Hussein
