= Gallery of city flags in Asia =

This page lists the city flags in Asia. It is a part of the Lists of city flags, which is split into continents due to its size.

== Asian Russia ==
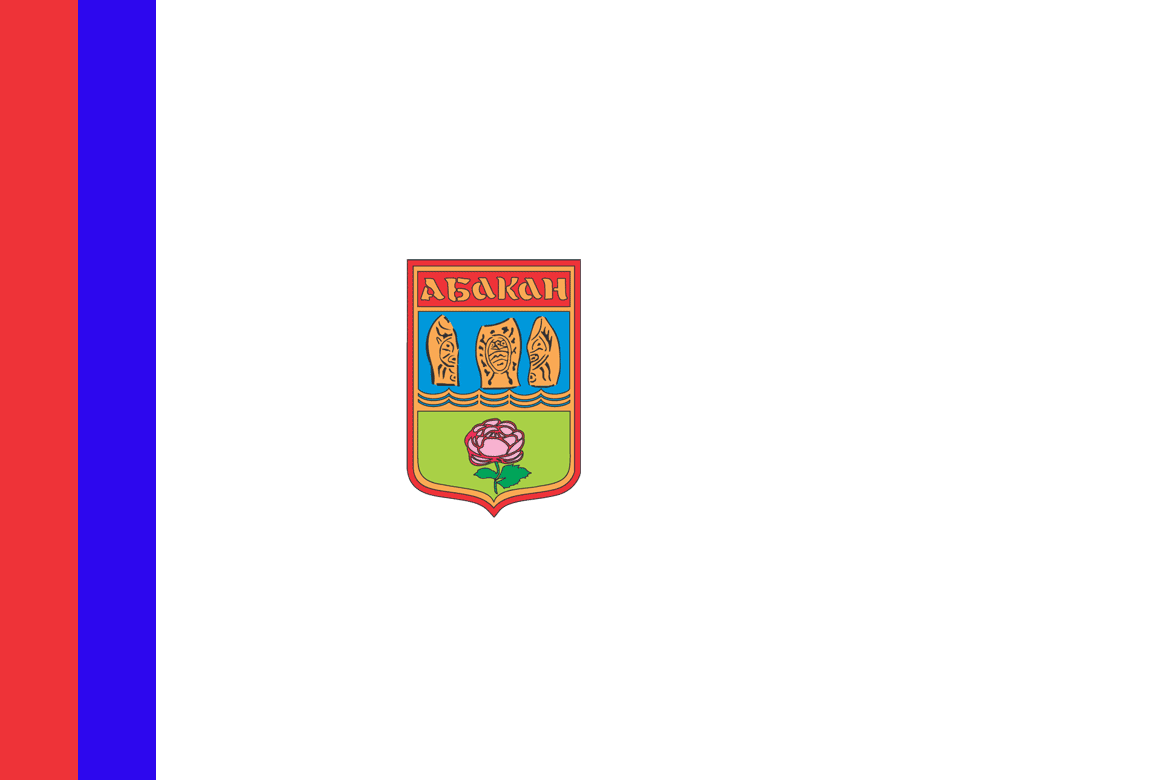
Abakan

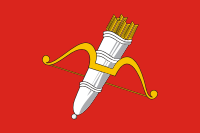
Achinsk

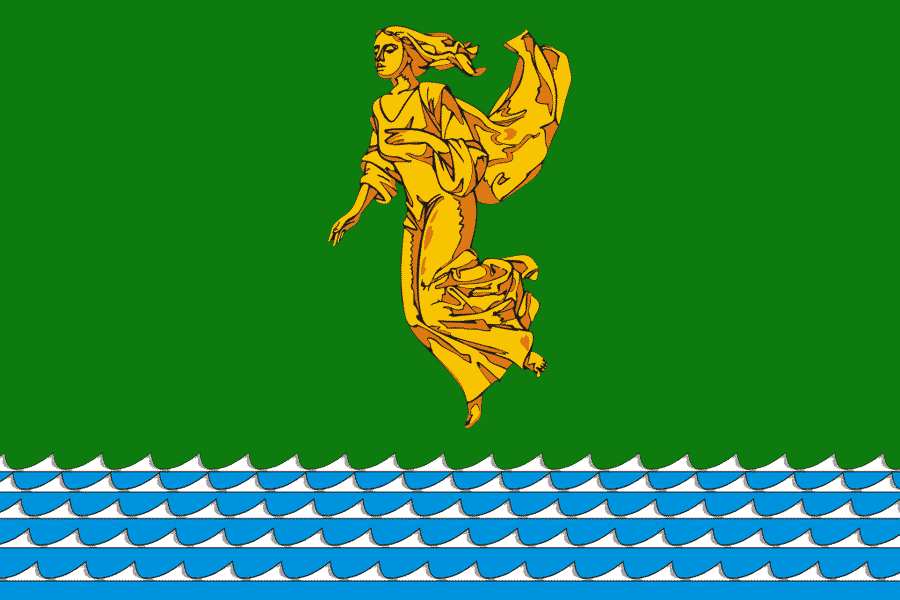
Angarsk

Artyom

Barnaul

Blagoveshchensk

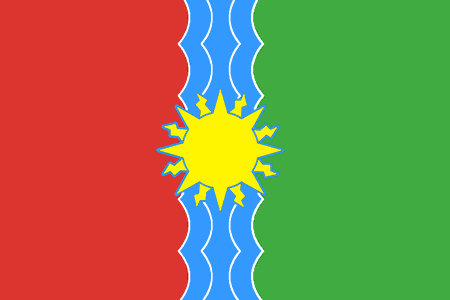
Bratsk

Chelyabinsk

Chita

Irkutsk

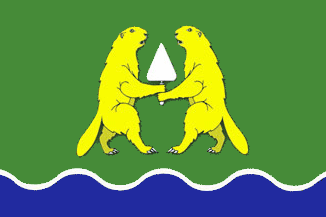
Iskitim

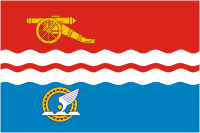
Kamensk-Uralsky

Kemerovo

Khabarovsk

Khanty-Mansiysk

Komsomolsk-on-Amur

Kopeysk

Krasnoyarsk

Kurgan

Kyzyl

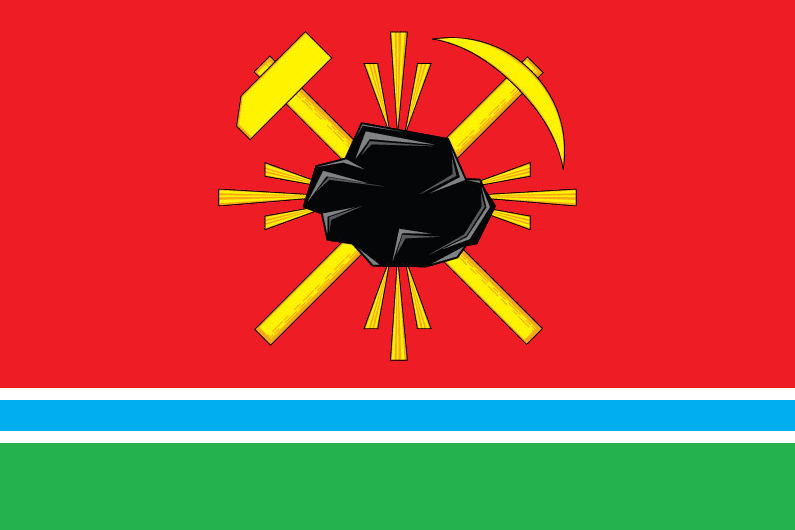
Leninsk-Kuznetsky

Magnitogorsk

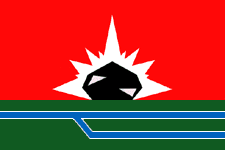
Mezhdurechensk

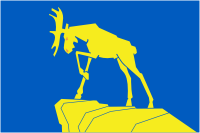
Miass

Nakhodka

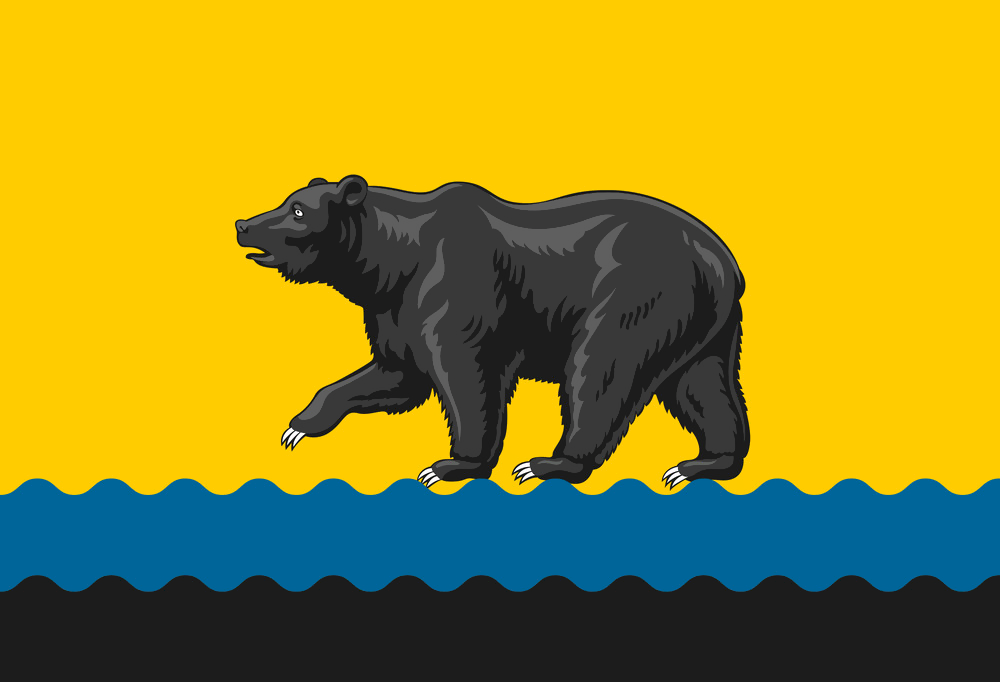
Nefteyugansk

Nizhnevartovsk

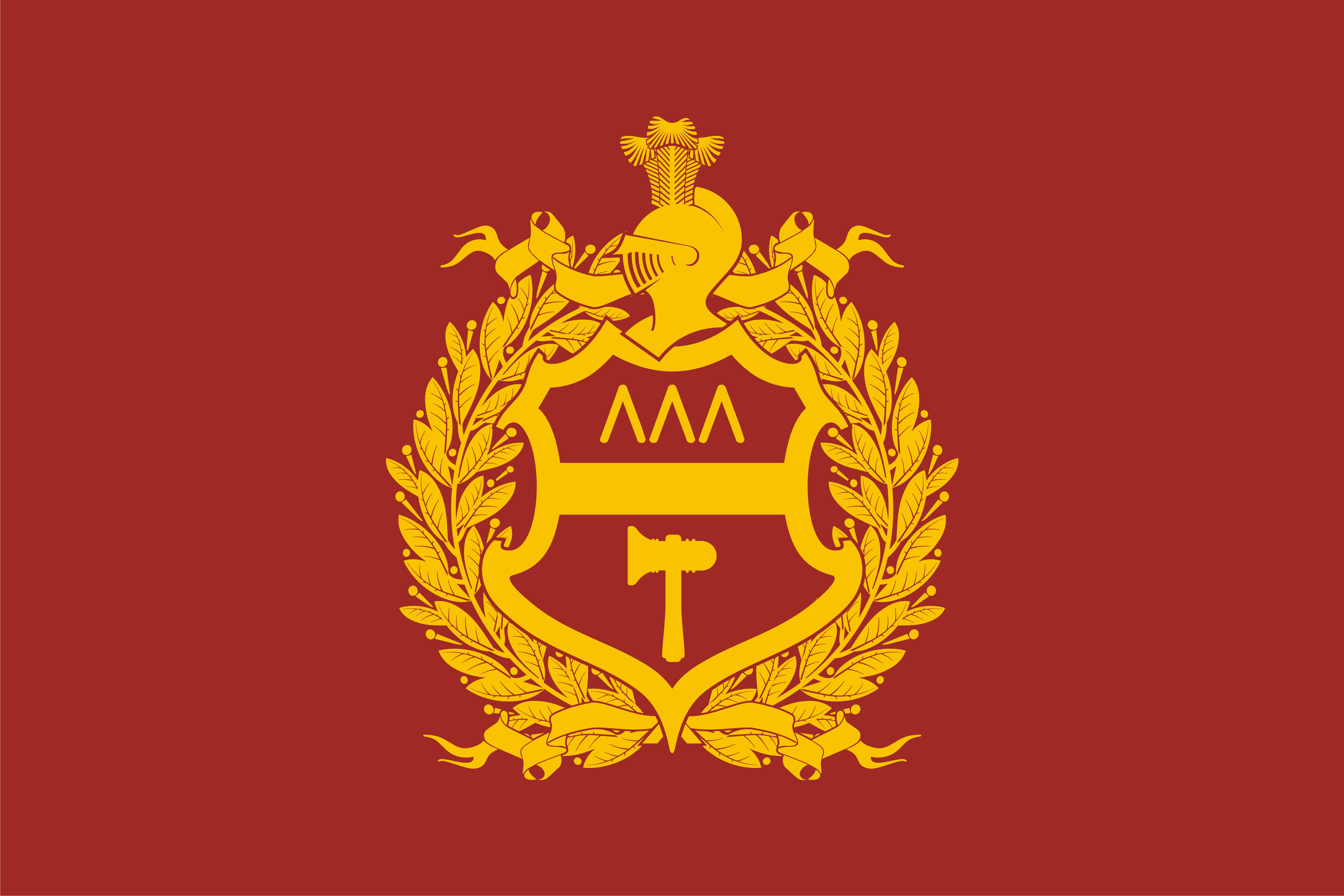
Nizhny Tagil

Norilsk

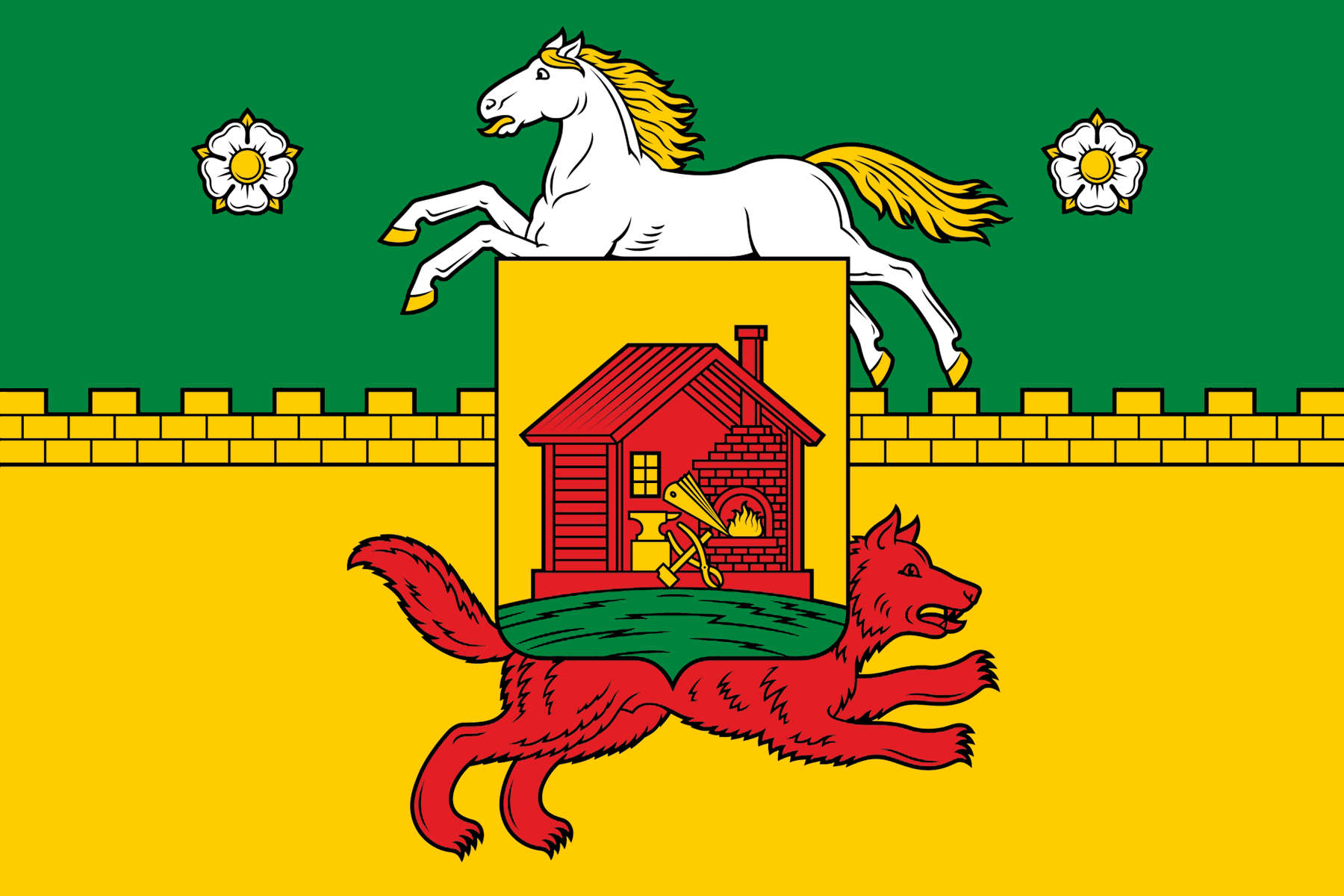
Novokuznetsk

Novosibirsk

Novy Urengoy

Noyabrsk

Omsk

Ozyorsk

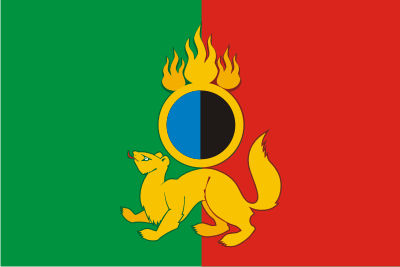
Pervouralsk

Petropavlovsk-Kamchatsky

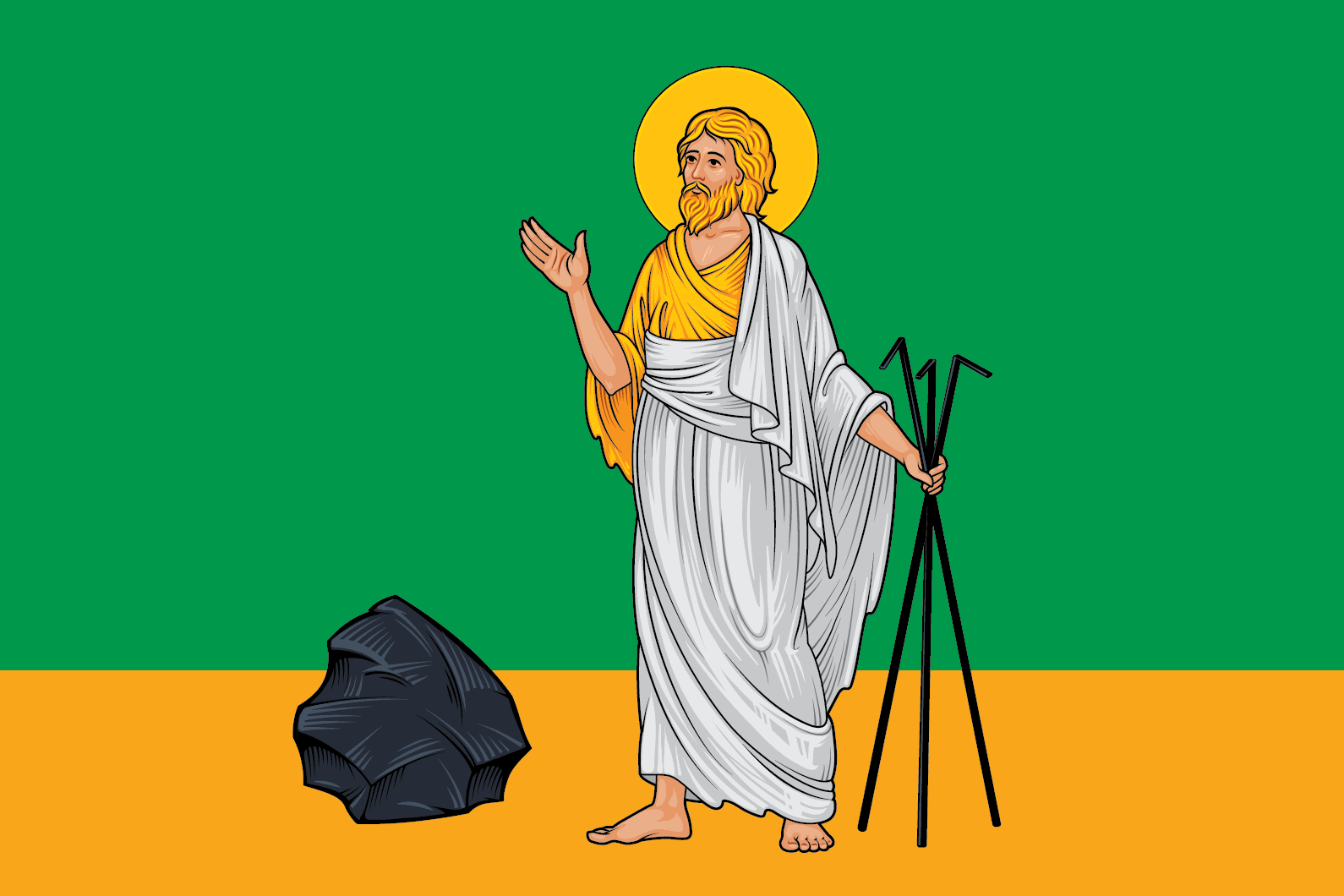
Prokopyevsk

Seversk

Surgut

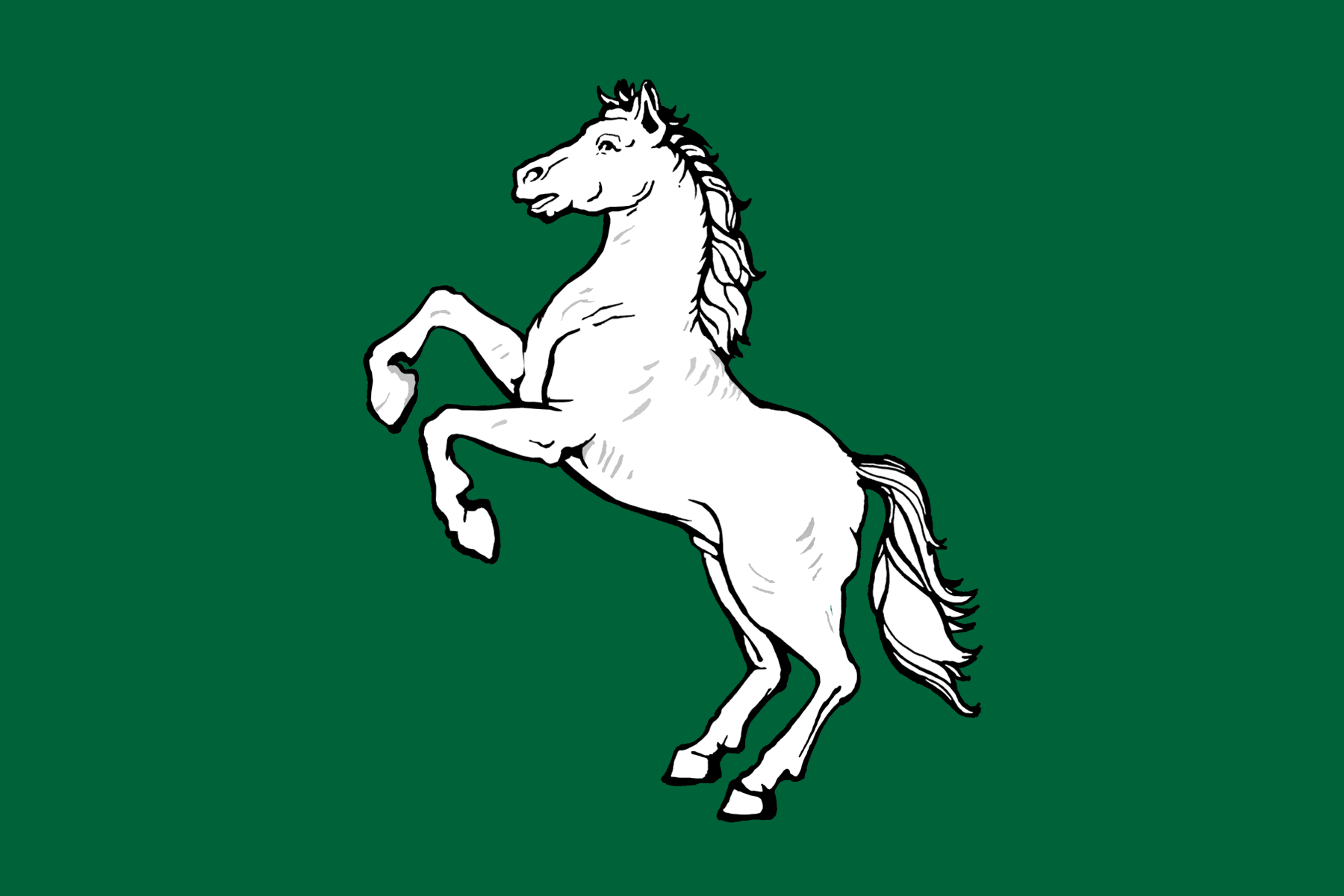
Tomsk

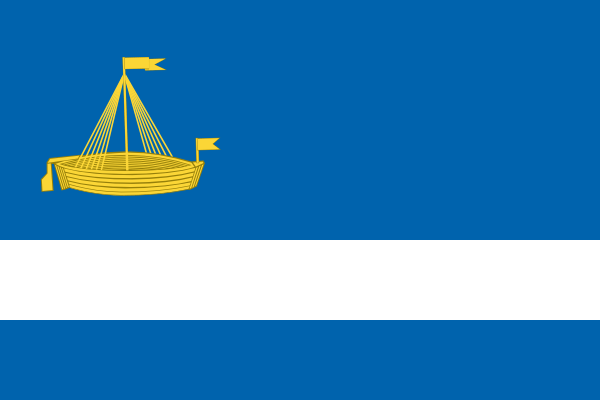
Tyumen

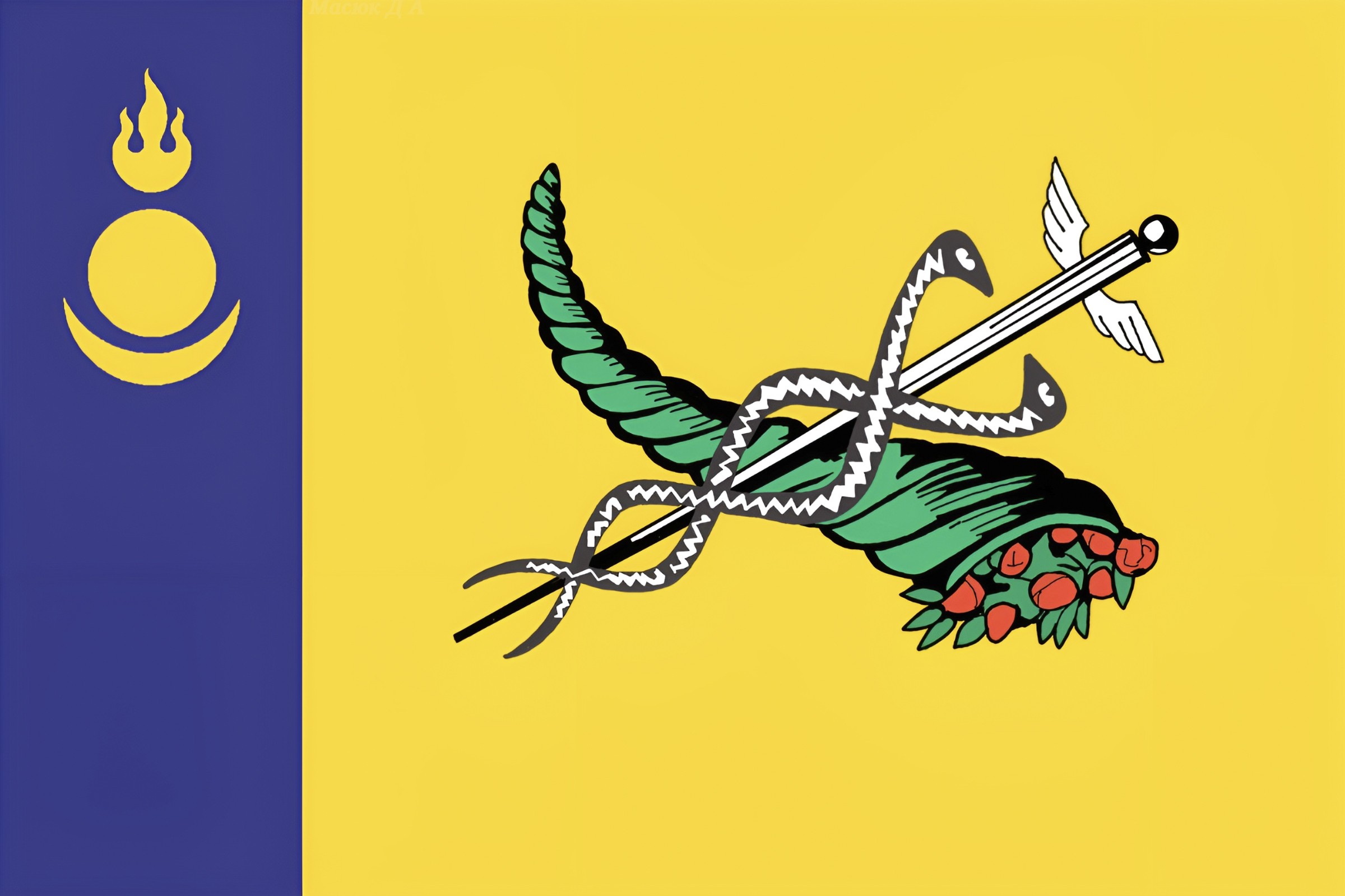
Ulan-Ude

Vladivostok

Yakutsk

Yekaterinburg

Yuzhno-Sakhalinsk

Zlatoust

== Caucasus ==
=== Armenia ===
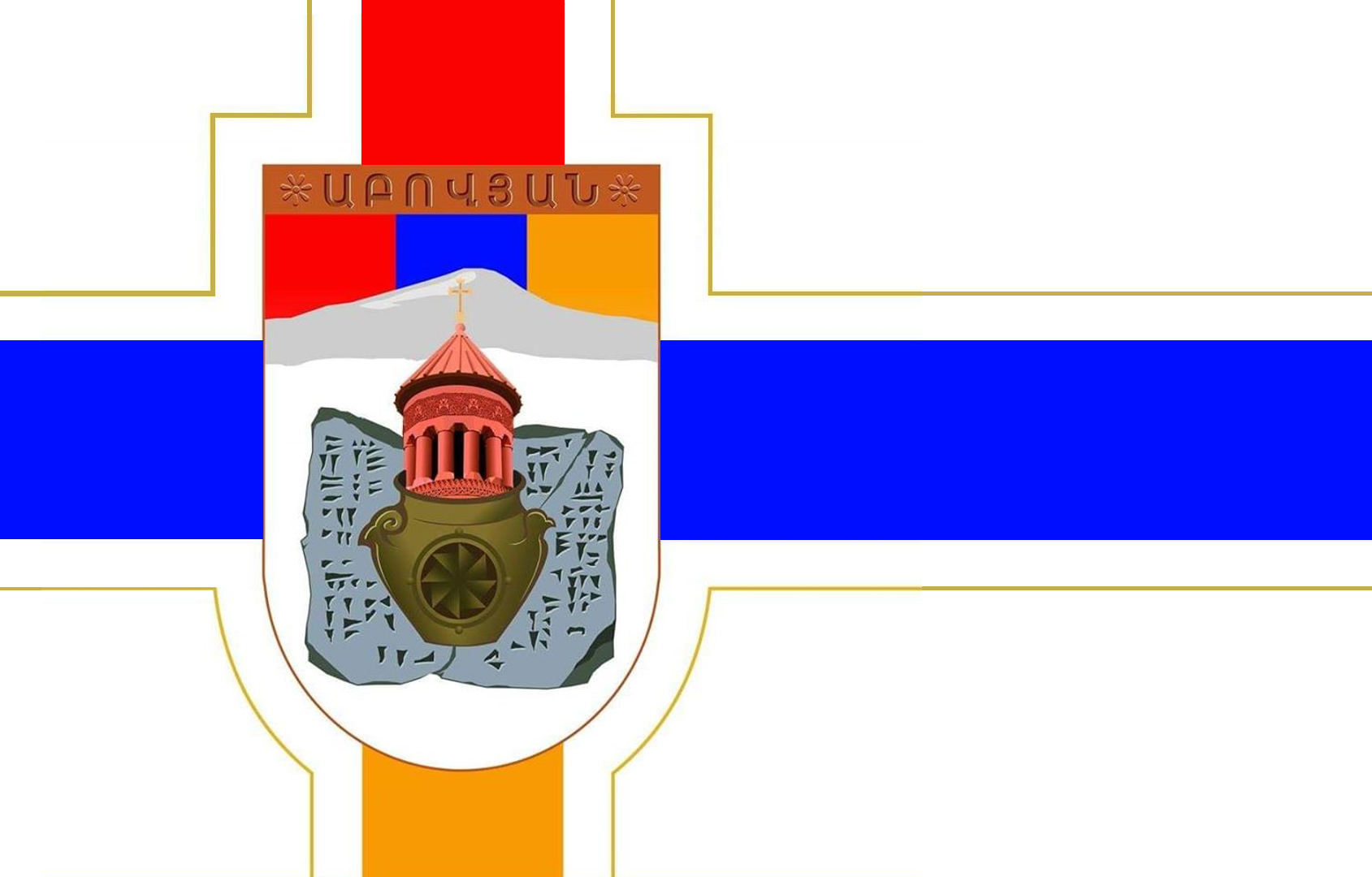
Abovyan

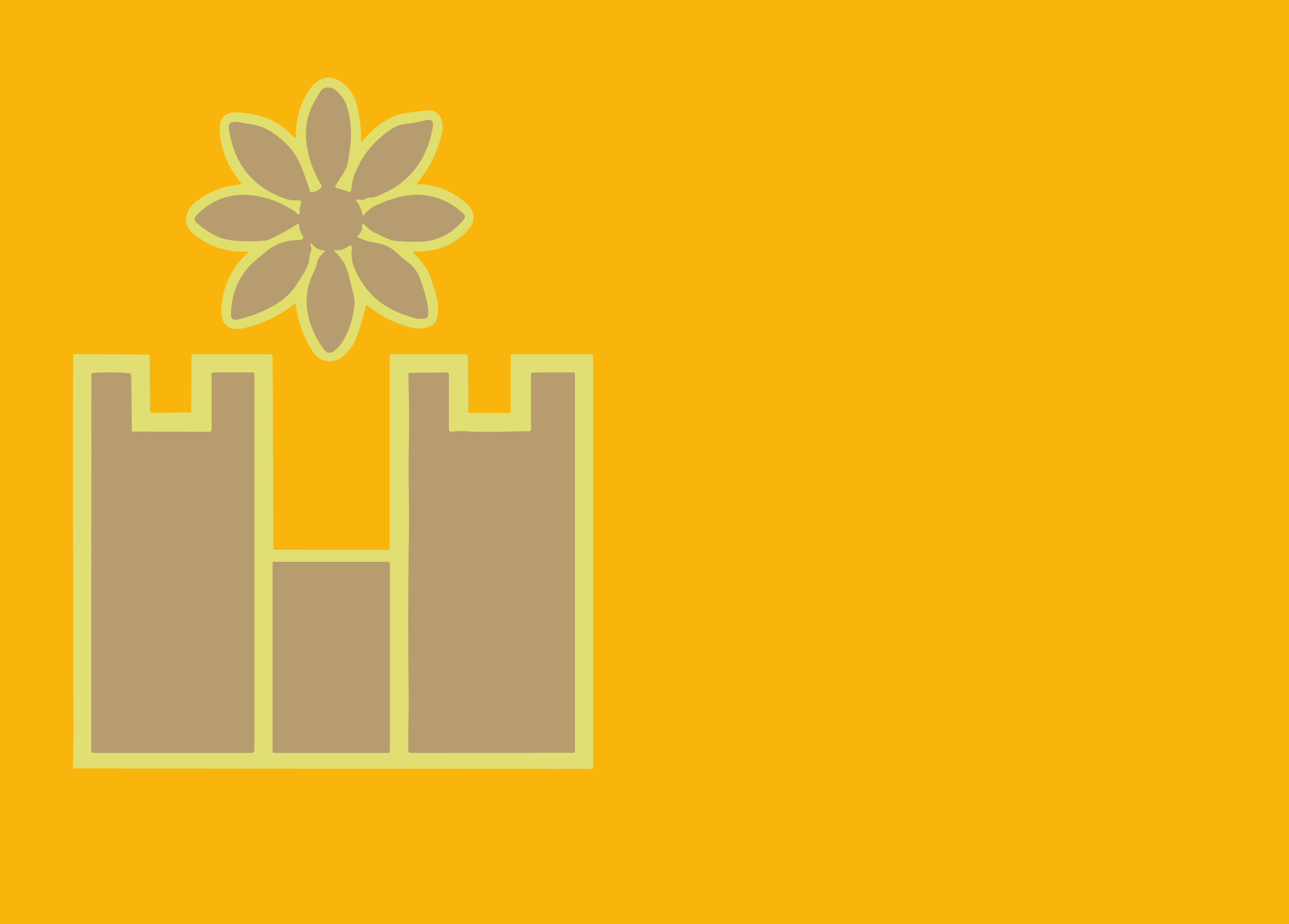
Artashat

Ashtarak

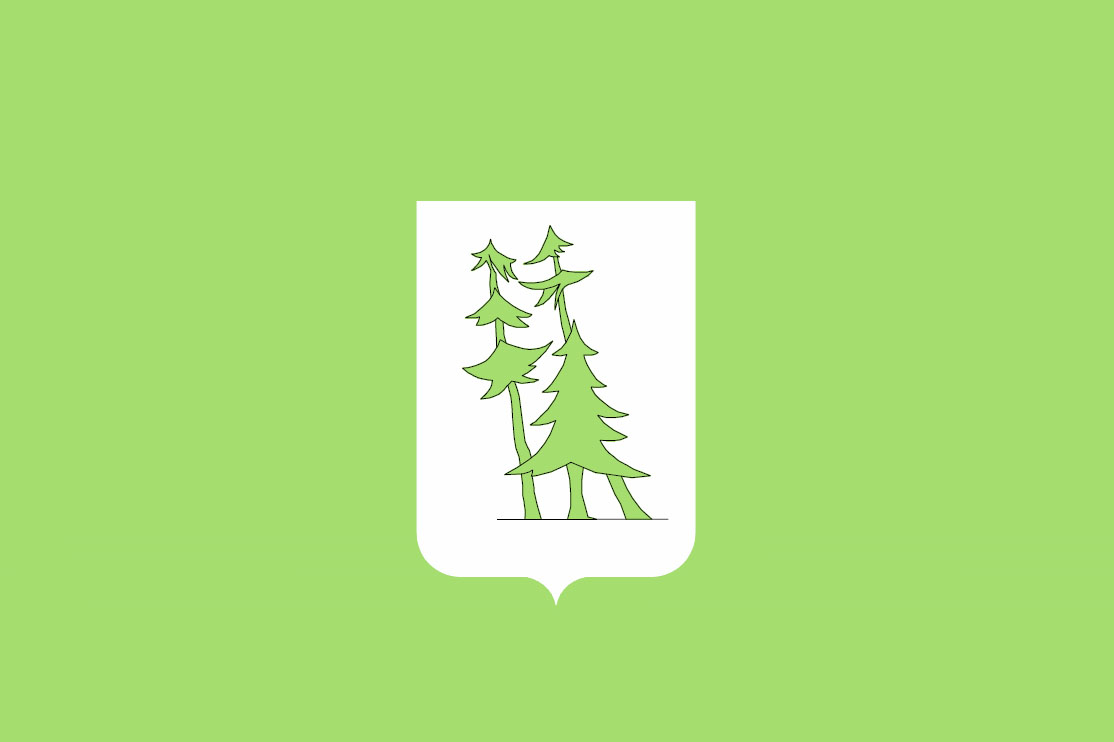
Dilijan

Gyumri

Vagharshapat

Yerevan

=== Azerbaijan ===
Baku

==== Historical ====
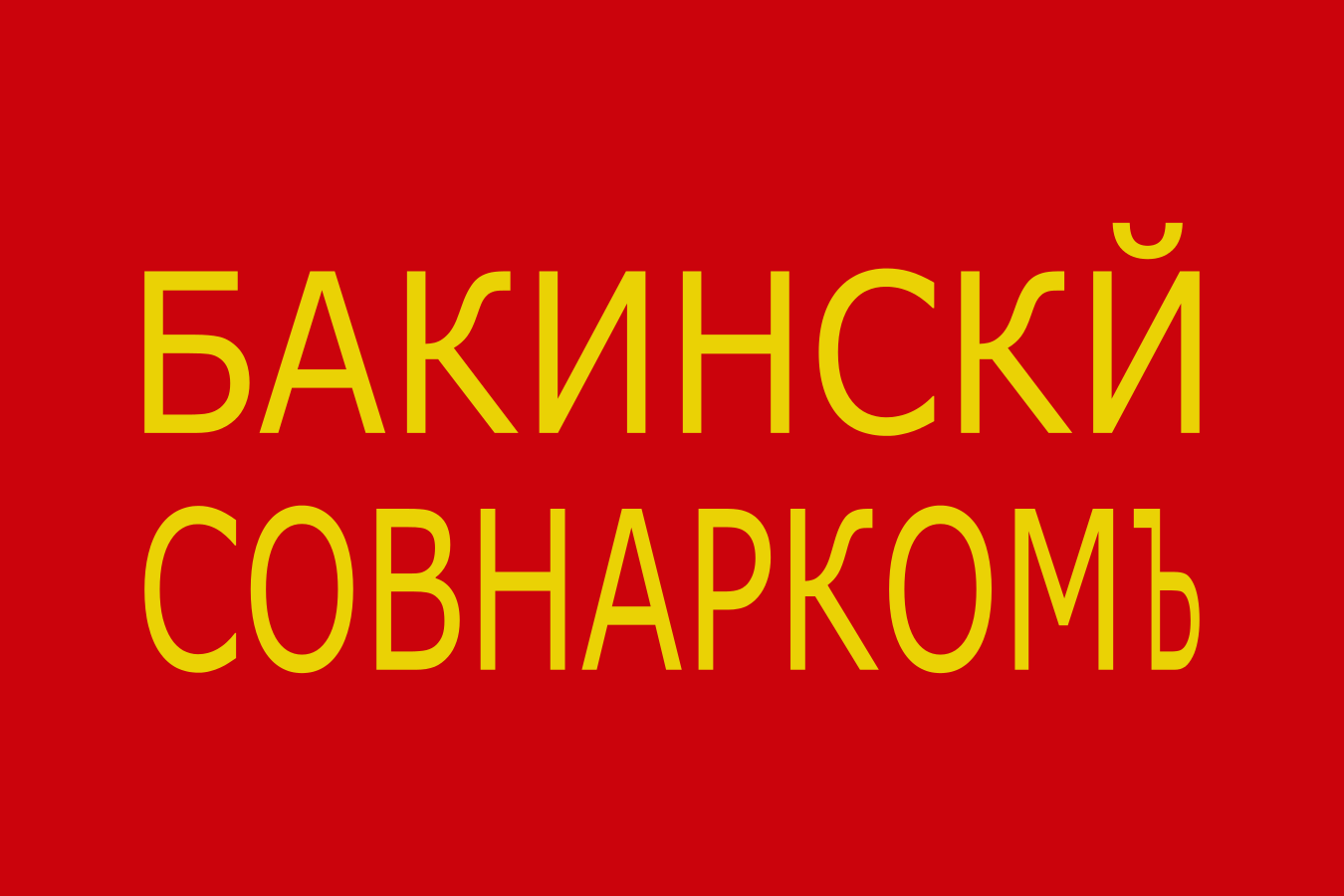
Baku (1918)

===== Artsakh =====
Stepanakert (2012-2023)

=== Georgia ===
Abasha

Akhaltsikhe

Akhmeta

Ambrolauri

Batumi

Bolnisi

Borjomi

Gori

Gurjaani

Khashuri

Kobuleti

Kutaisi (details)

Lagodekhi

Lanchkhuti

Marneuli

Mtskheta

Oni

Poti

Rustavi

Samtredia

Senaki

Tbilisi (details)

Telavi

Tkibuli

Tsalenjikha

Tsalka

Tsqaltubo

Zestaponi

Zugdidi

==== Abkhazia ====
Sukhumi

==== South Ossetia ====
Tskhinvali

==== Historical ====
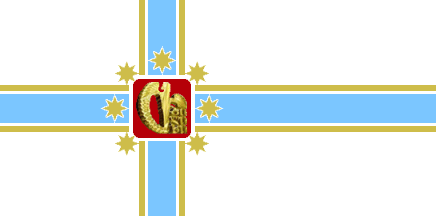
Tbilisi (until 2005)

== Middle East ==
=== Bahrain ===
Manama

Muharraq

=== Cyprus ===
Nicosia (details)

==== Northern Cyprus ====
North Nicosia (details)

=== Iran ===
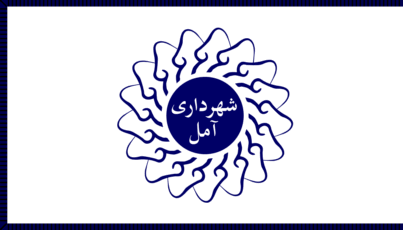
Amol

Chaharbagh

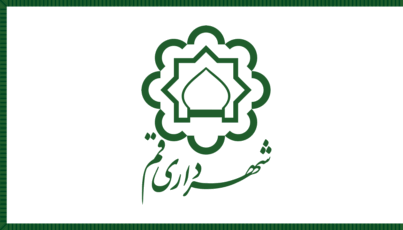
Qom

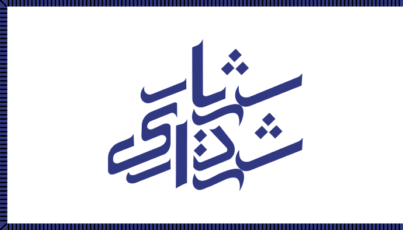
Shahriar

Shiraz

Tabriz

Tehran

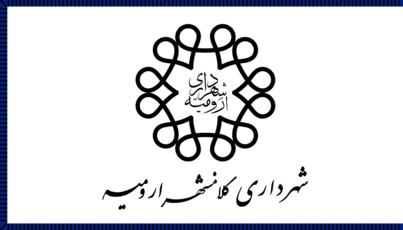
Urmia

=== Iraq ===
Baghdad

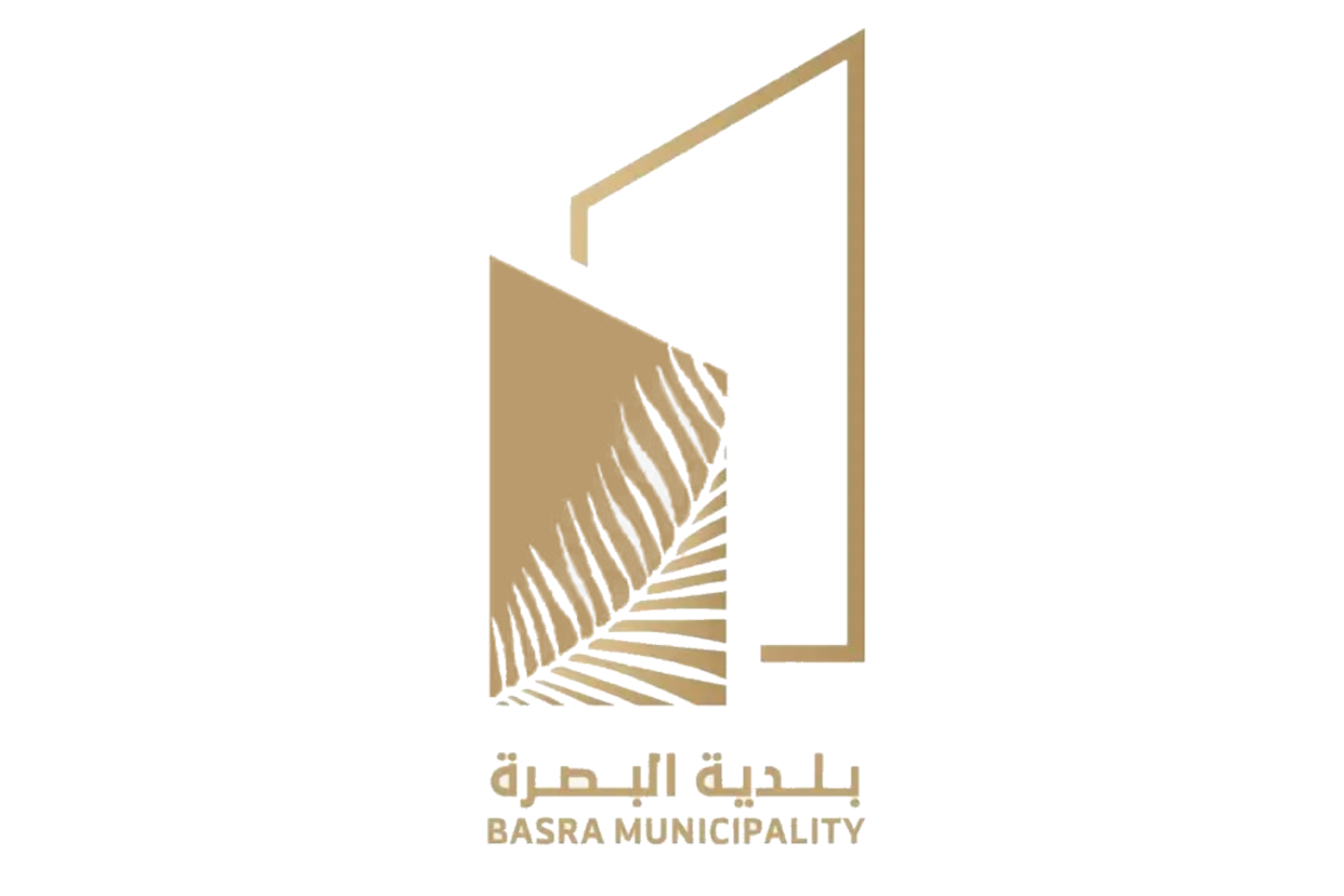
Basra

=== Israel ===
Abu Ghosh

Ashdod

Ashkelon

Bat Yam

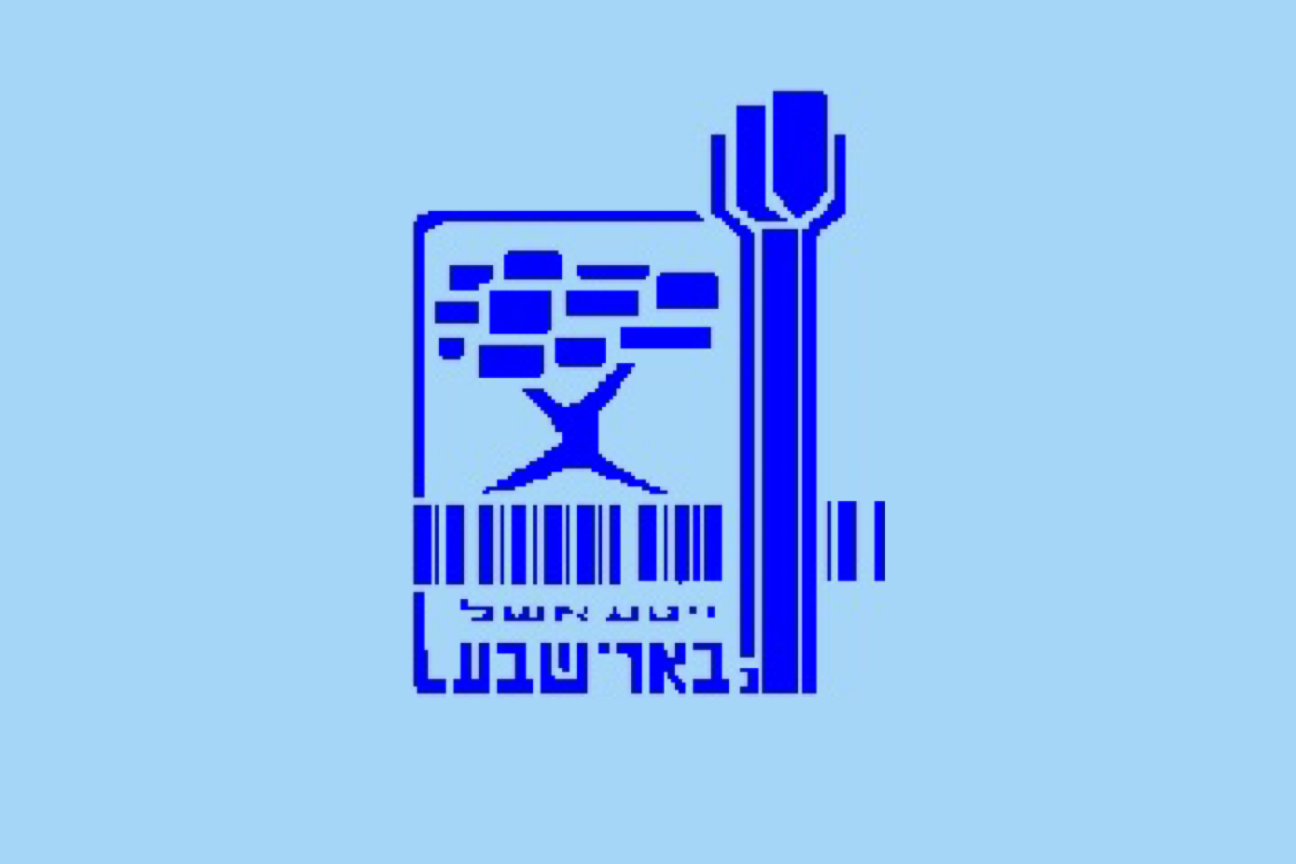
Beersheba

Bnei Brak

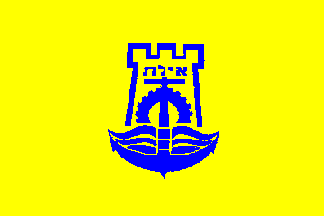
Eilat

Givatayim

Haifa

Har Hebron

Herzliya

Hof Azza

Holon (variant)

Jerusalem

Karmiel

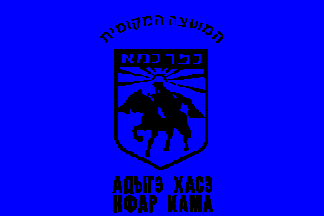
Kfar Kama

Kfar Saba

Kiryat Gat

Nesher

Netanya

Nof HaGalil

Or Yehuda

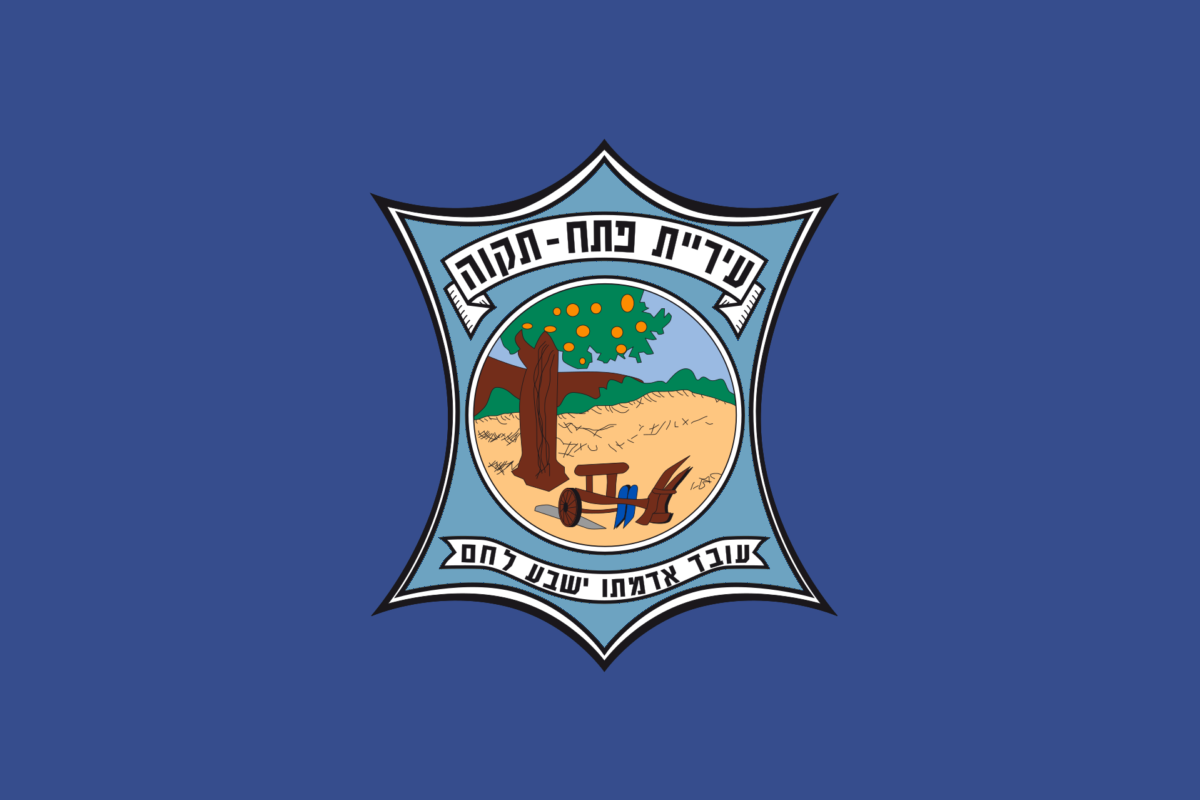
Petah Tikva

Ramat Gan

Ramat HaSharon

Rishon LeZion

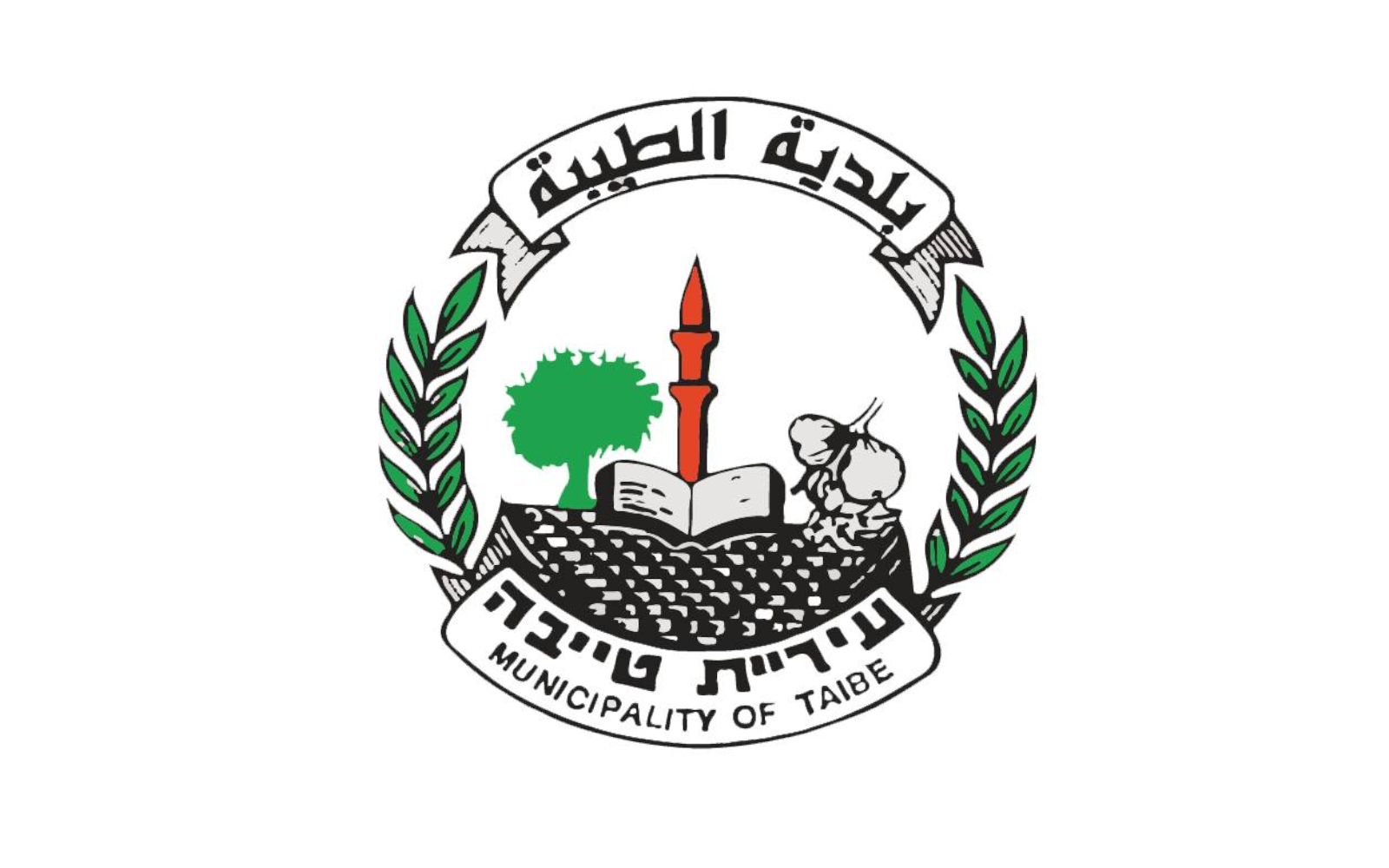
Tayibe

Tel Aviv (details)

Tiberias

Yokneam Illit

=== Jordan ===
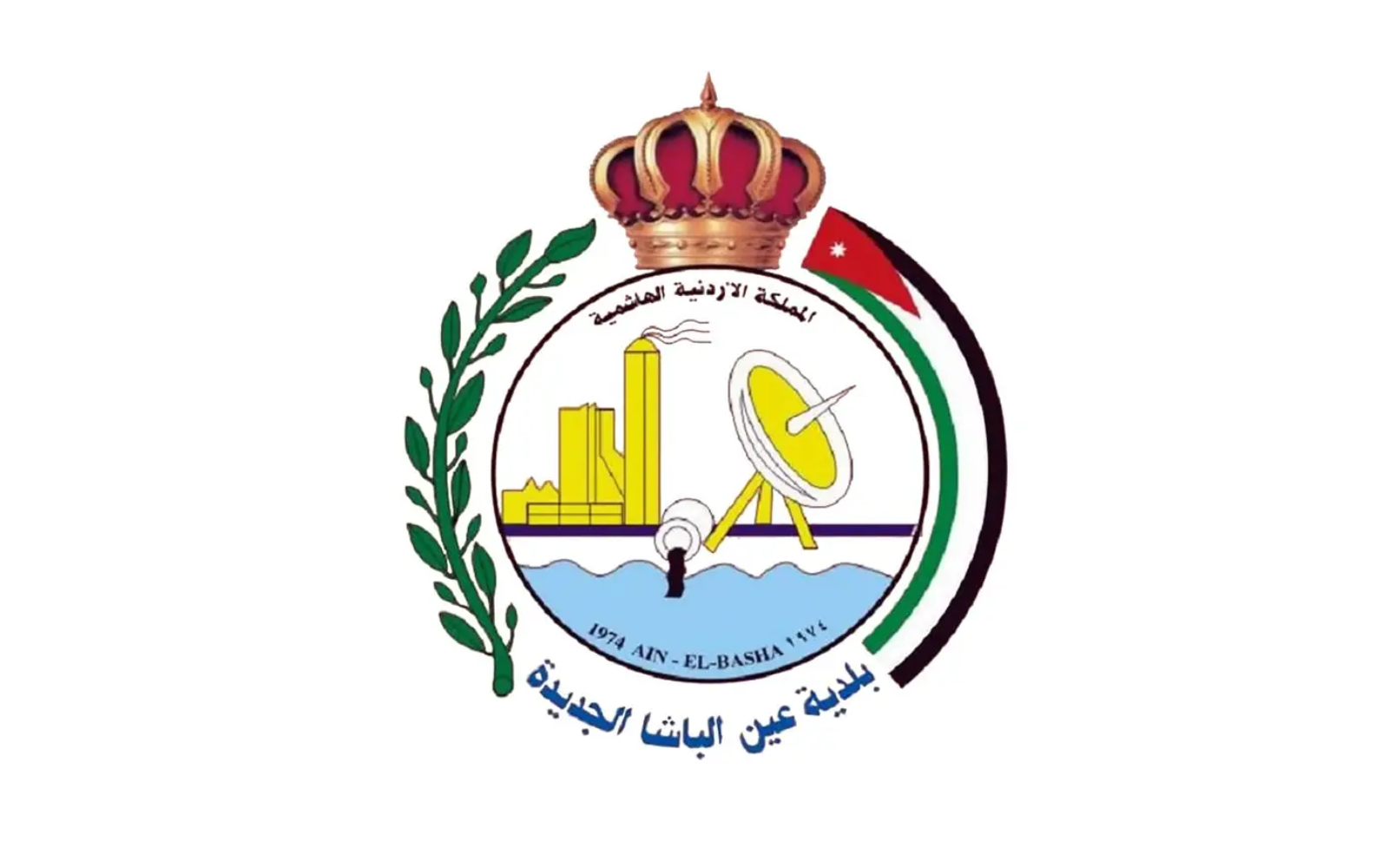
Ain Al-Basha

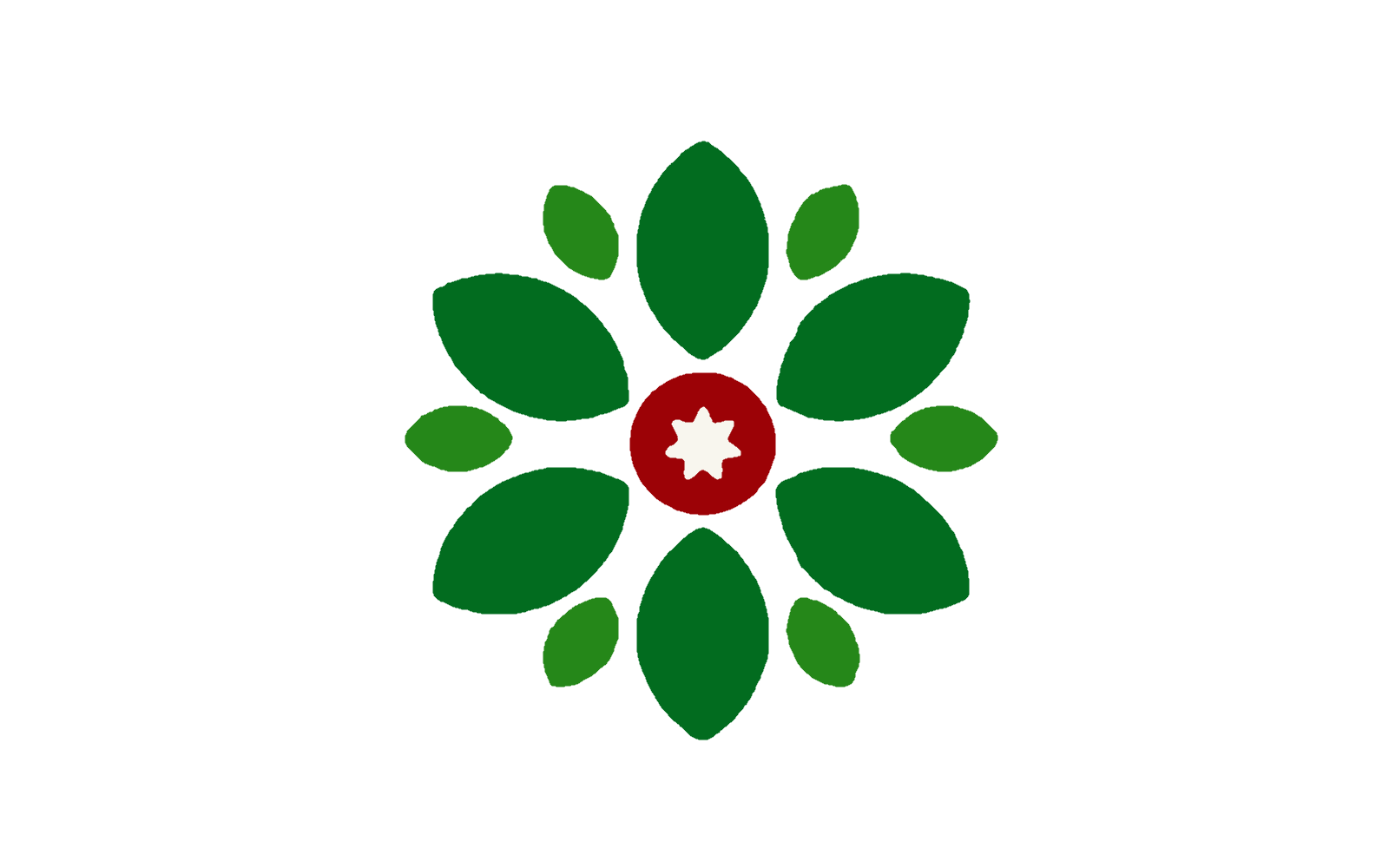
Al-Jizah

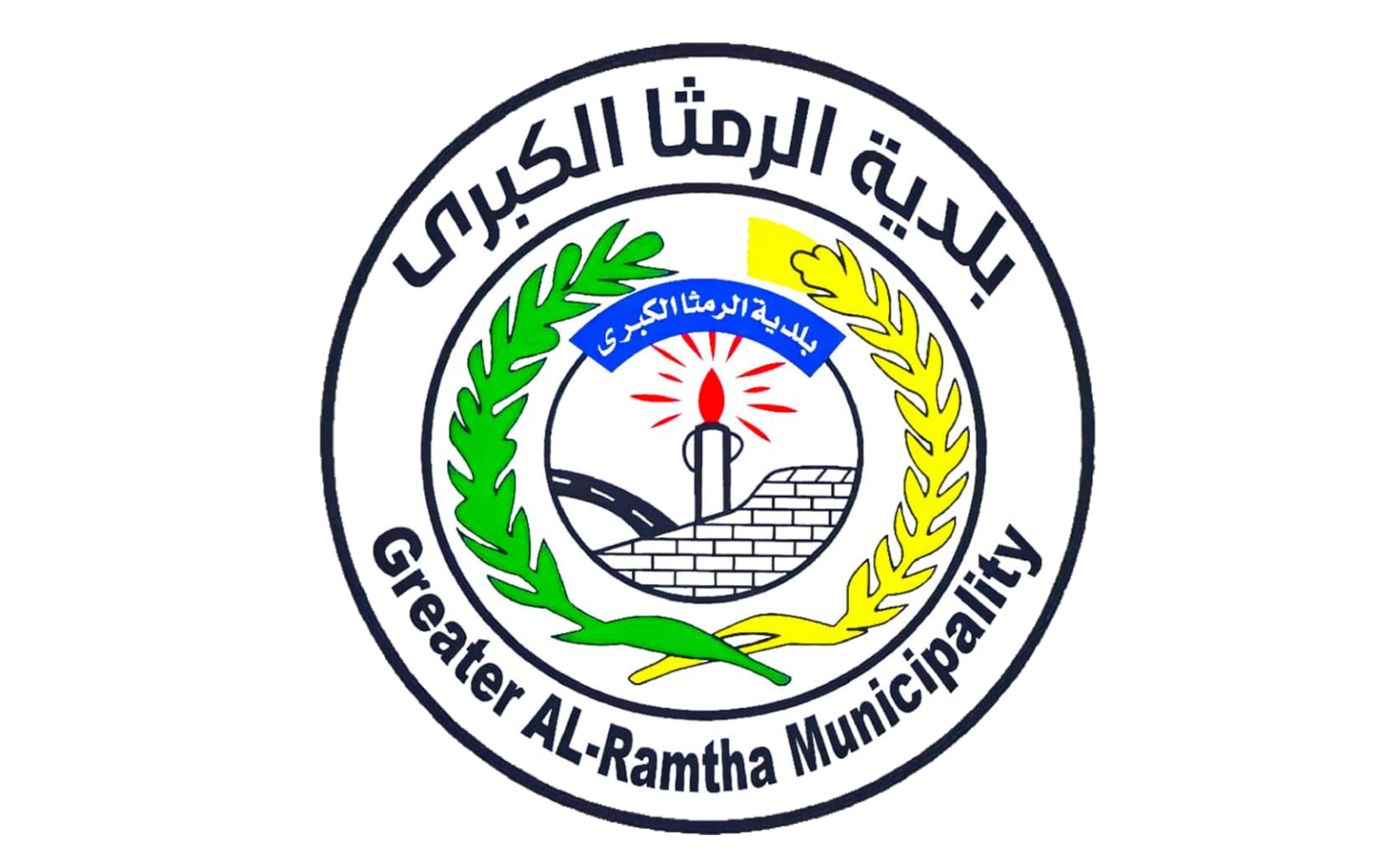
Al-Ramtha

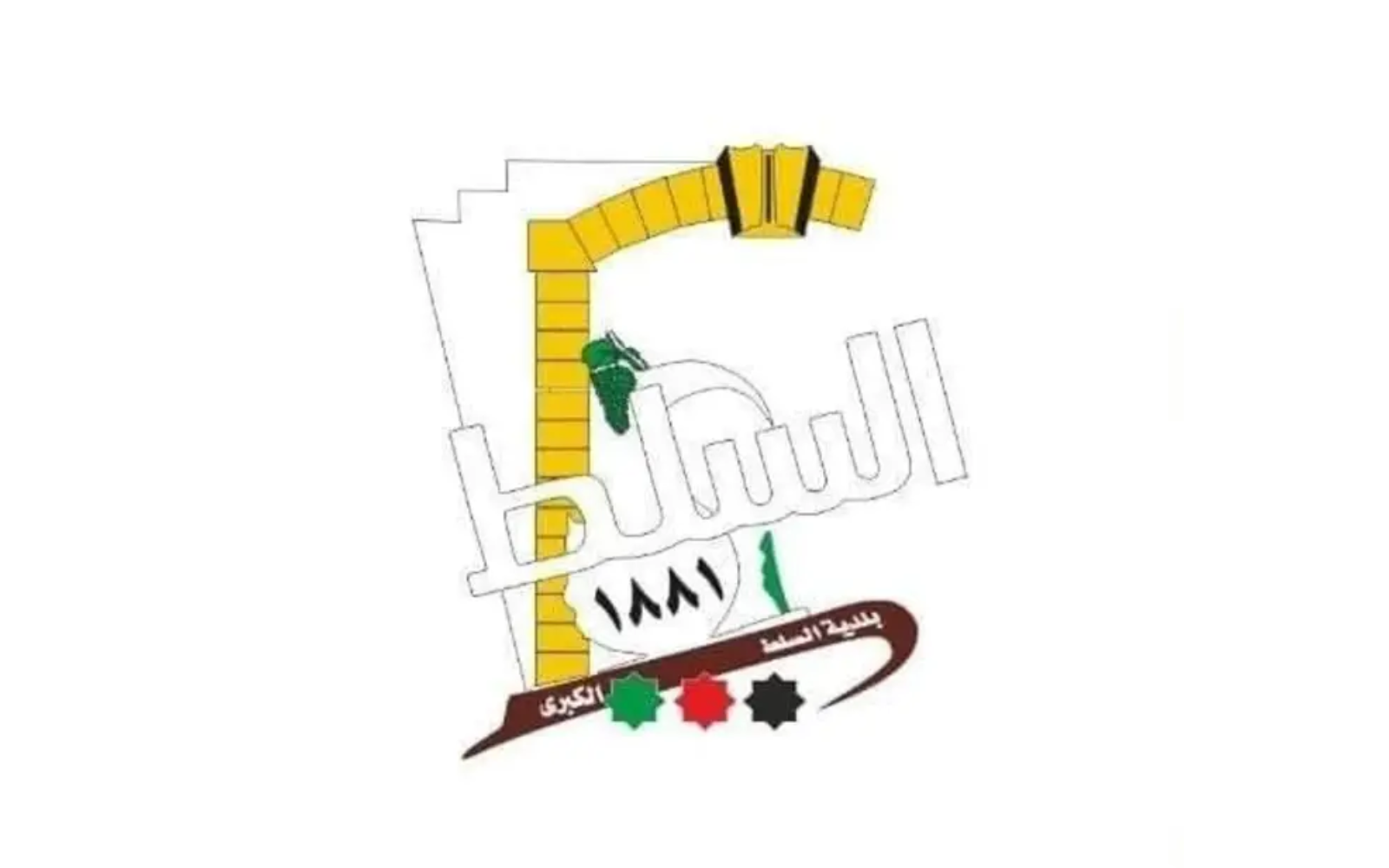
As-Salt

Amman (details)

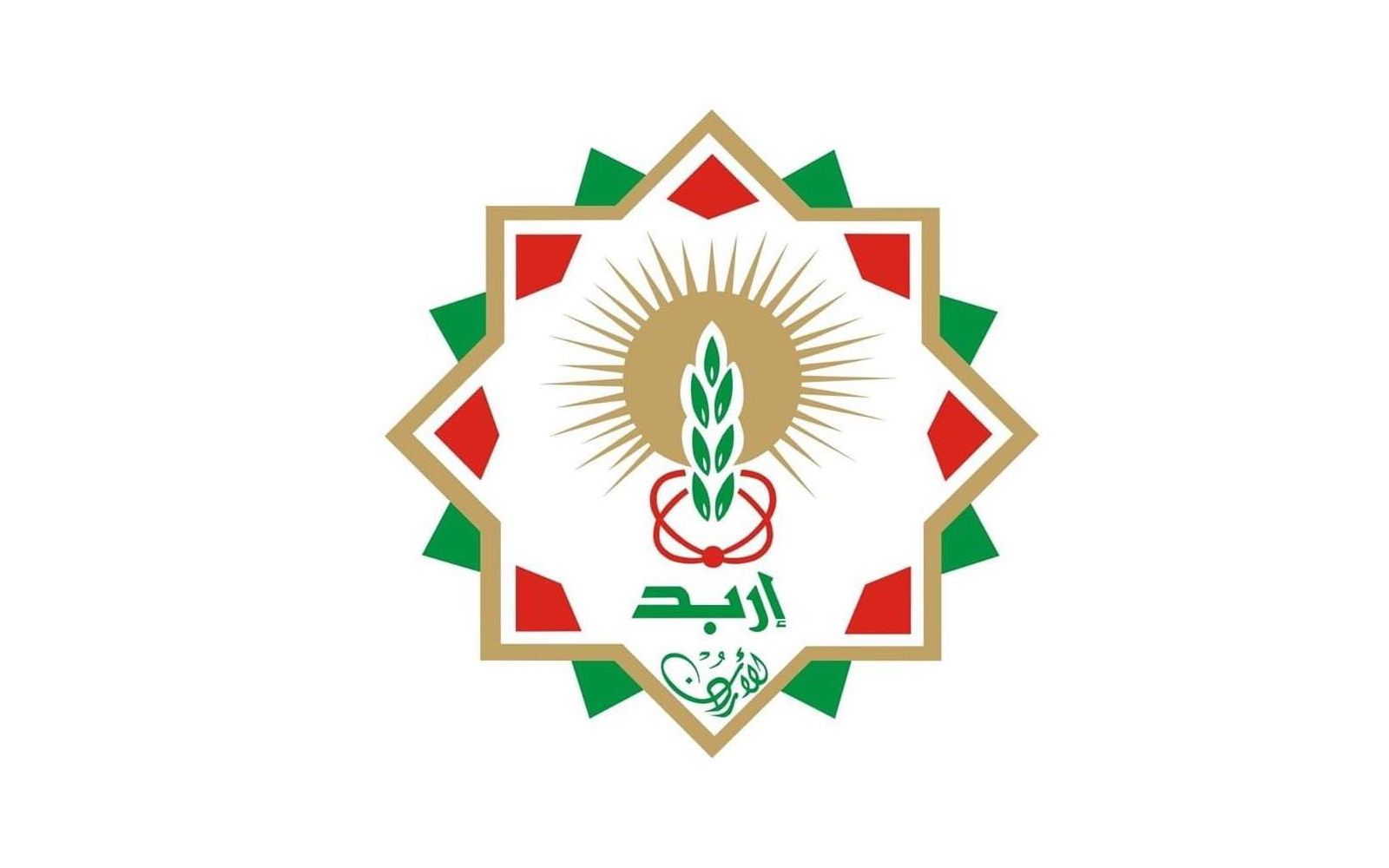
Irbid

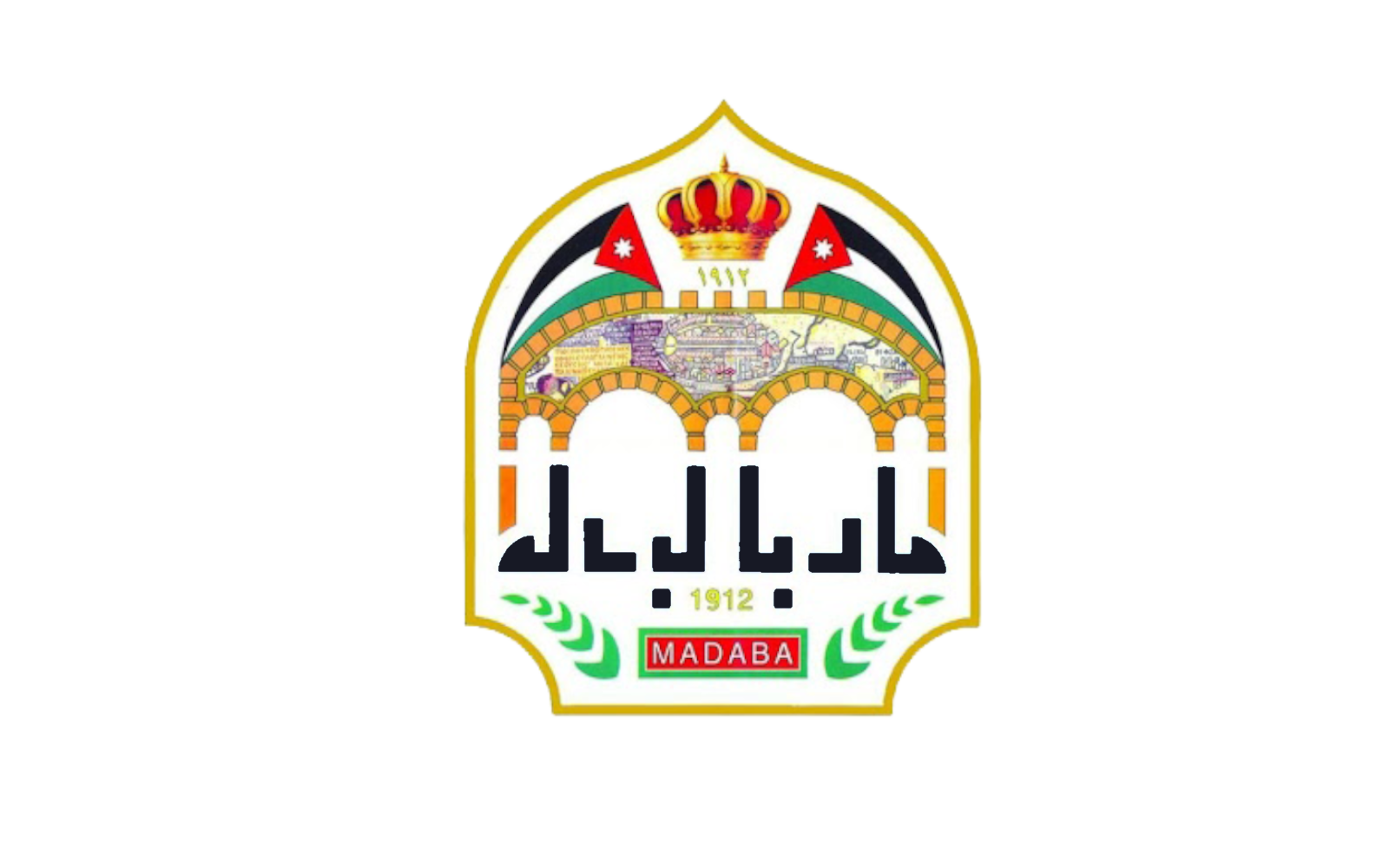
Madaba

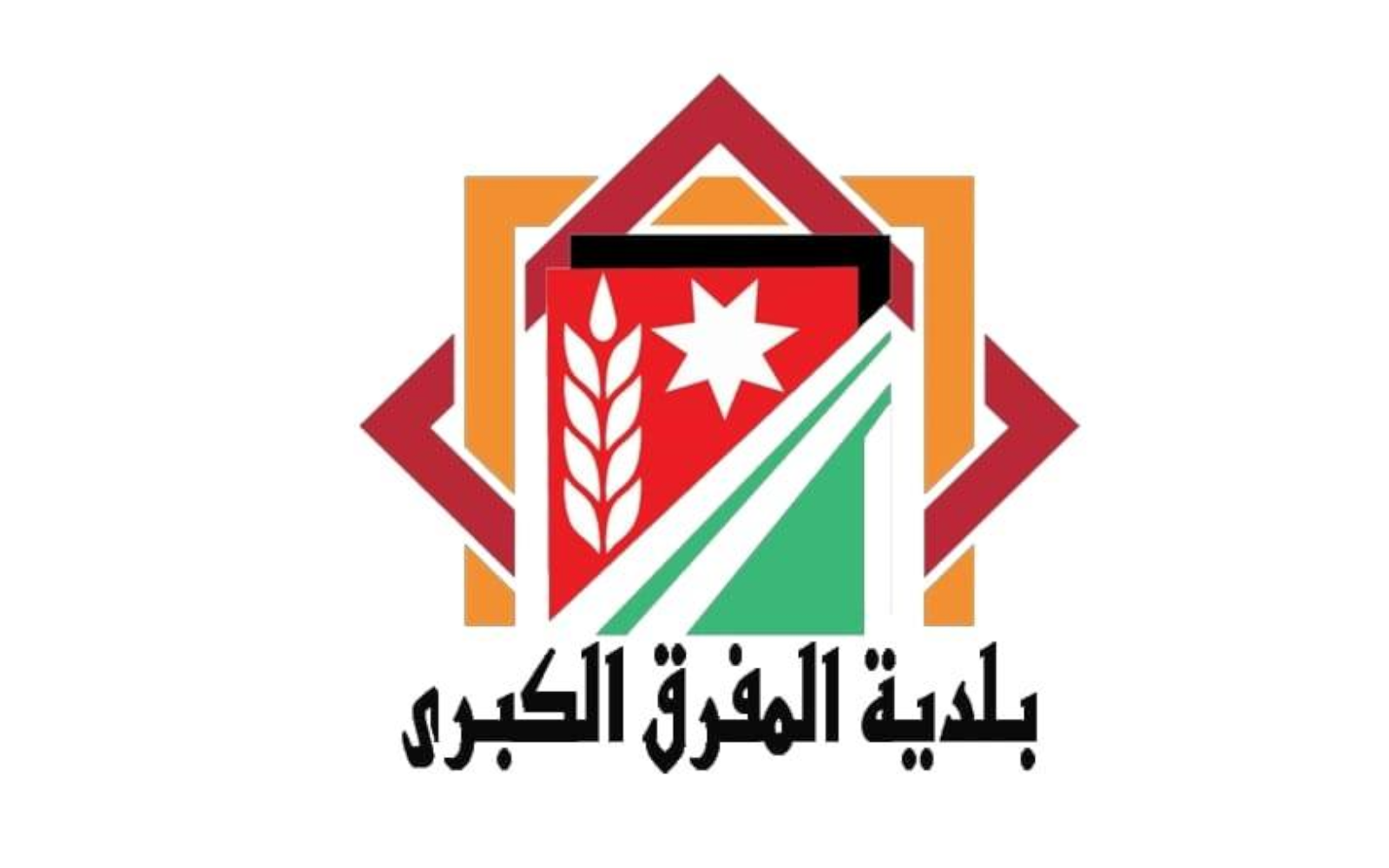
Mafraq

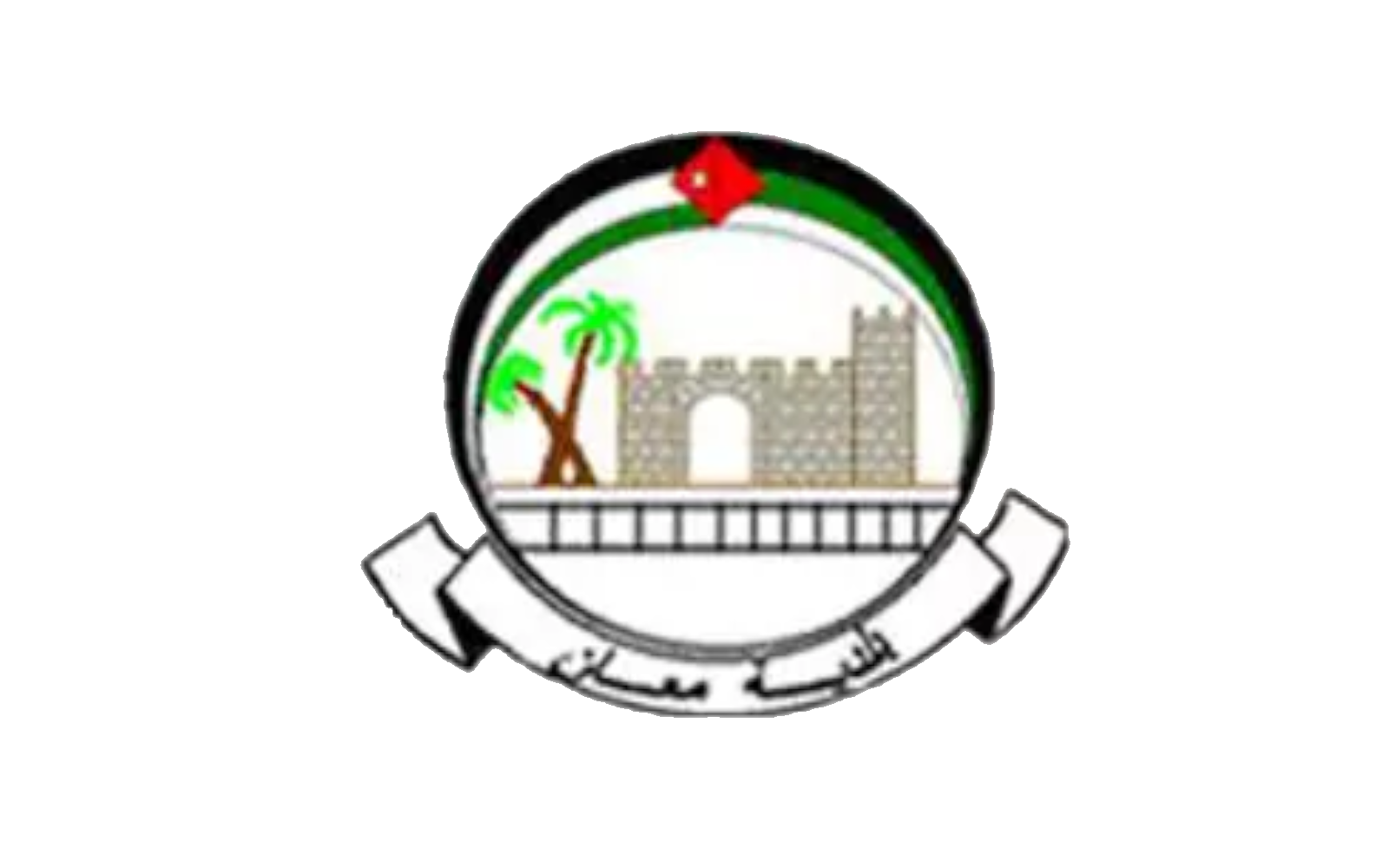
Ma'an

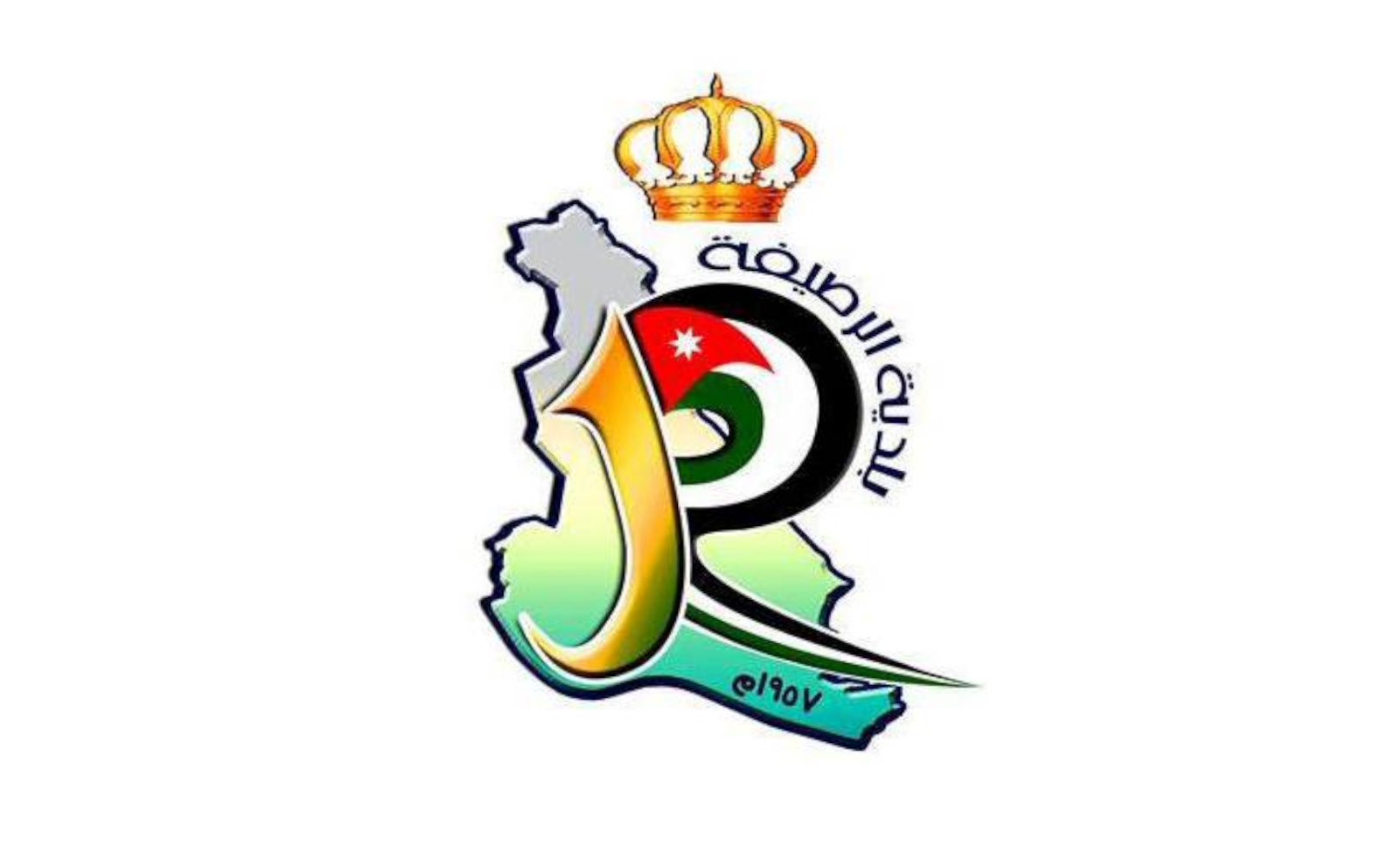
Russeifa

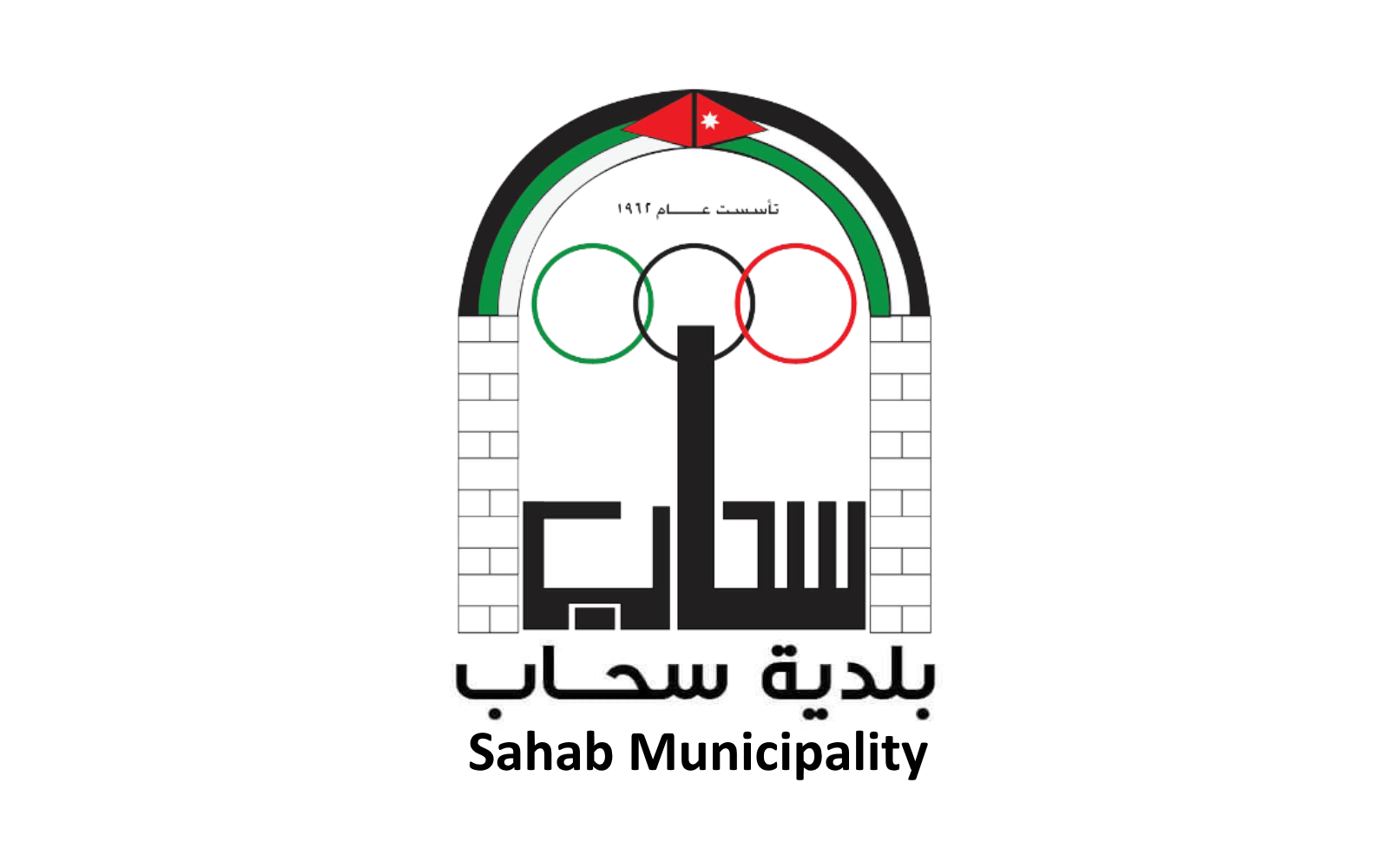
Sahab

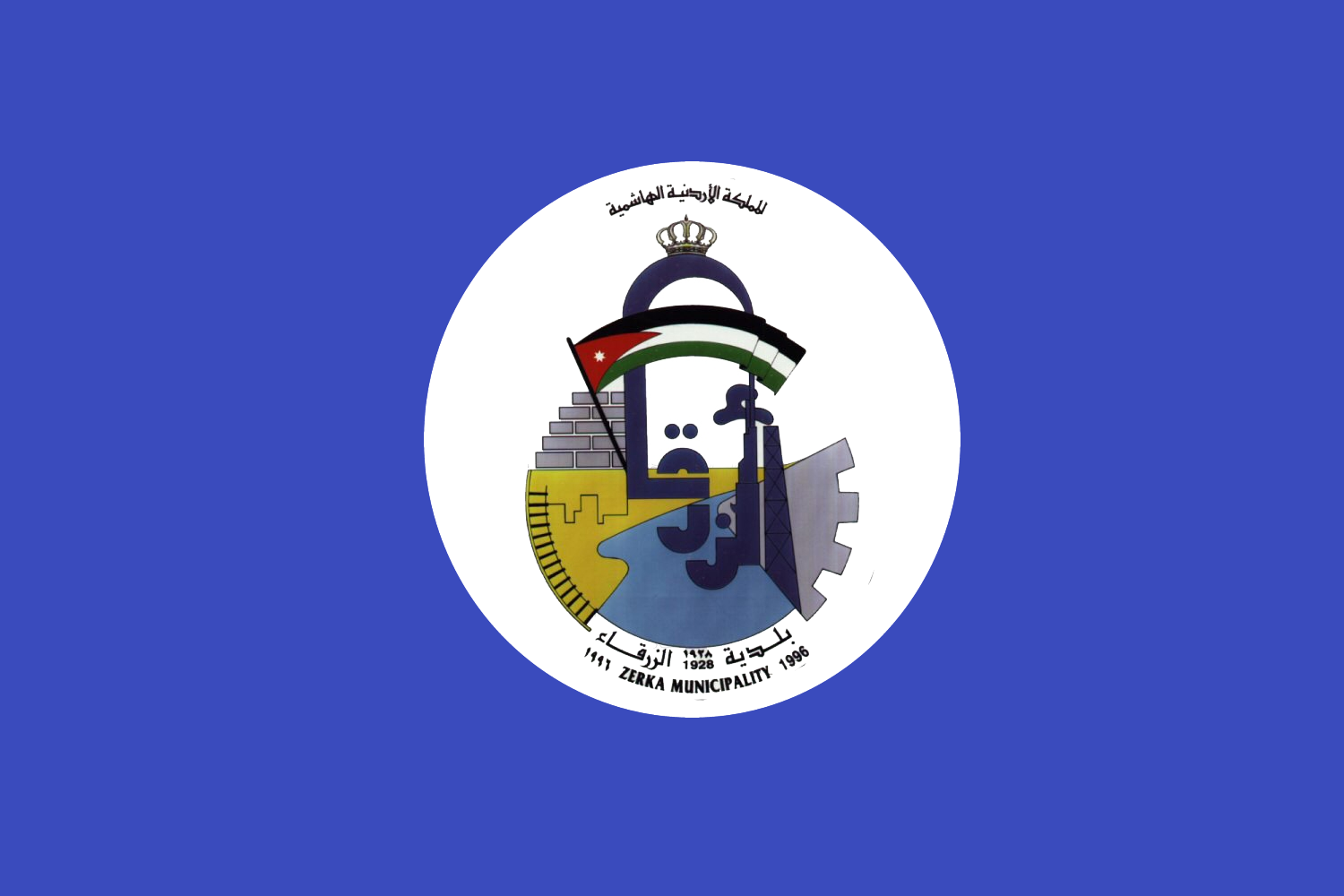
Zarqa

==== Historical ====
Amman (until 2009)

=== Kuwait ===
Kuwait City

=== Lebanon ===
Beirut

==== Historical ====
Deir al-Qamar (1830)

=== Oman ===
Muscat

=== Palestine ===
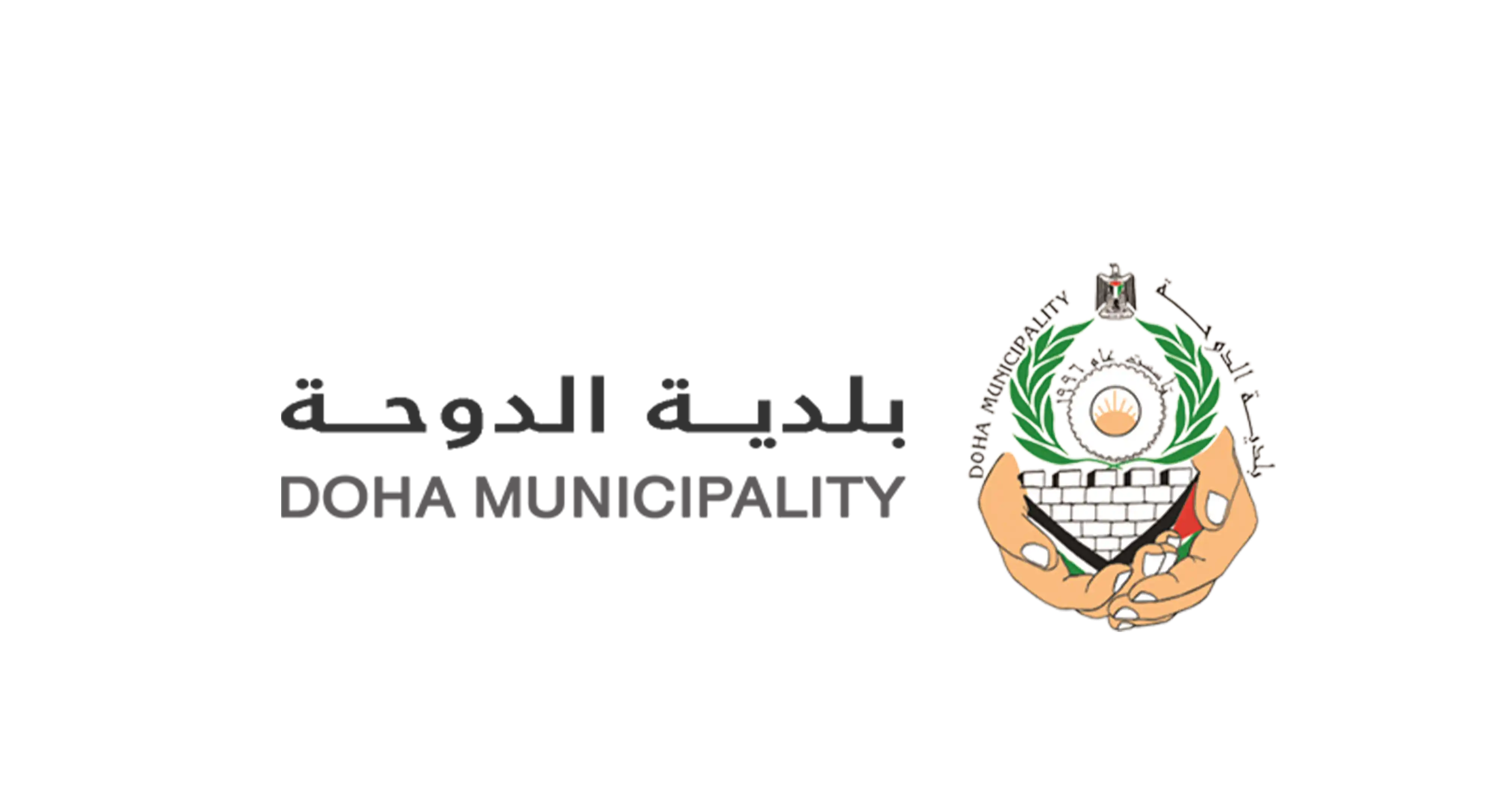
Al-Dawha

Jerusalem (unofficial, proposed)

Ramallah

=== Saudi Arabia ===
Mecca

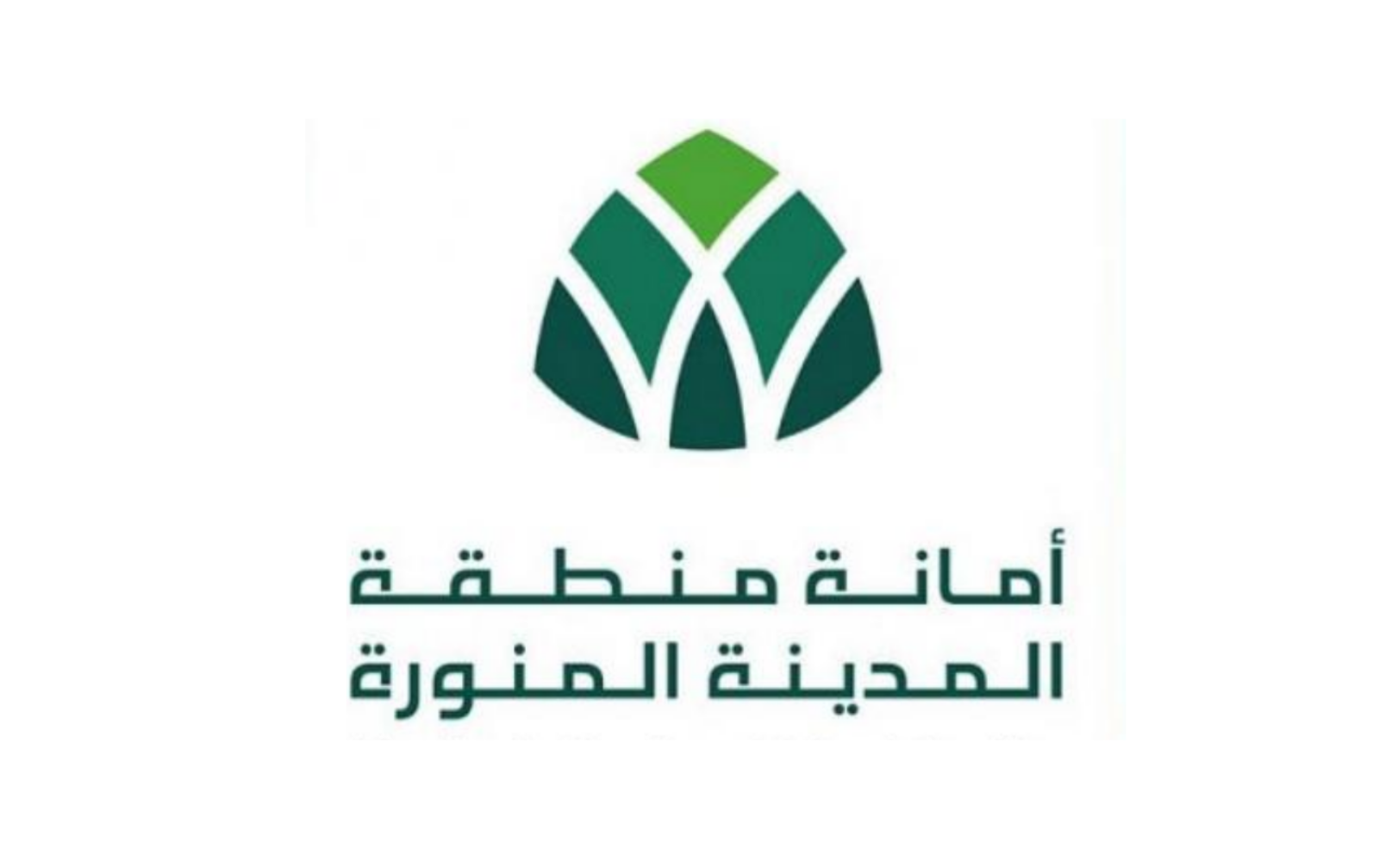
Medina

==== Historical ====
Mecca (until 1916)

=== Syria ===
==== Historical ====
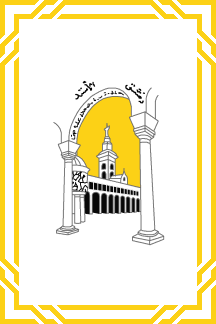
Damascus (until 2021)

Damascus (2021-2024)

=== Türkiye ===
Istanbul

Kastamonu

=== United Arab Emirates ===
Abu Dhabi

Ajman

Dubai

Ras Al Khaimah

Sharjah

Umm Al Quwain

==== Historical ====
Abu Dhabi (1899-1901)

Abu Dhabi (1936-1958)

Dibba (until 1951)

Fujairah (until 1952, 1961-1975)

Fujairah (1952-1961)

Kalba (until 1952)

=== Yemen ===
==== Historical ====
Aden (1937-1963)

Aden (1963-1967)

== Central Asia ==
=== Kazakhstan ===
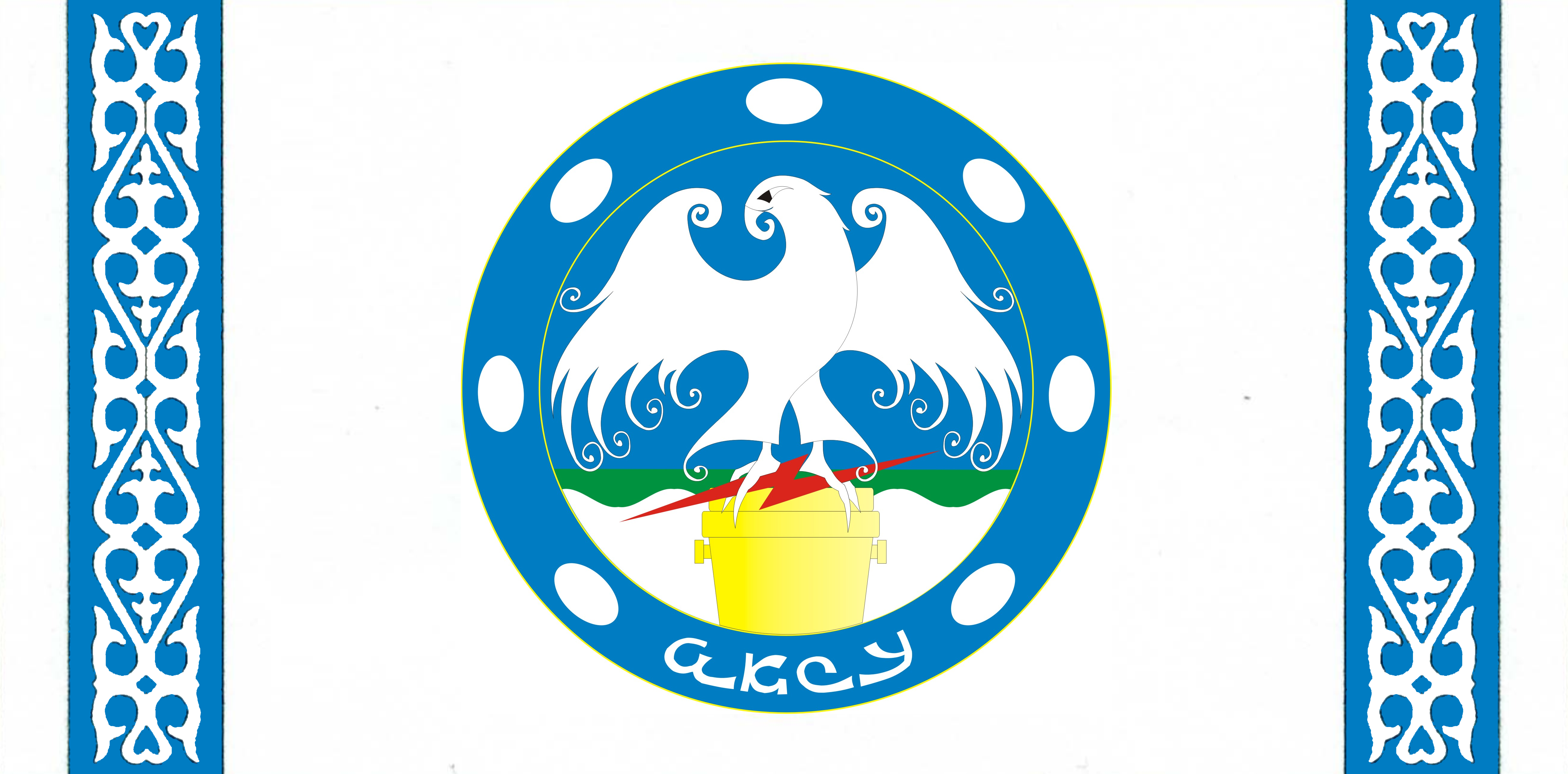
Aksu

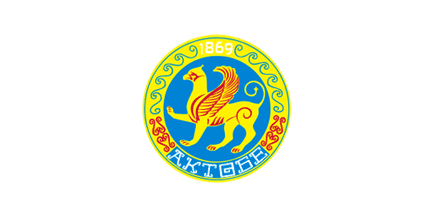
Aktobe

Almaty

Astana (details)

Atyrau

Baikonur

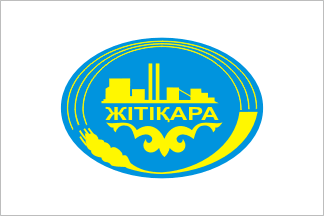
Jitiqara

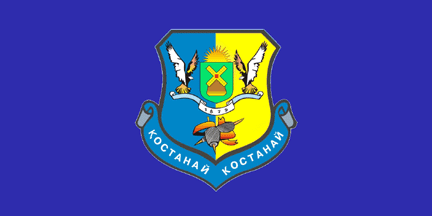
Kostanay

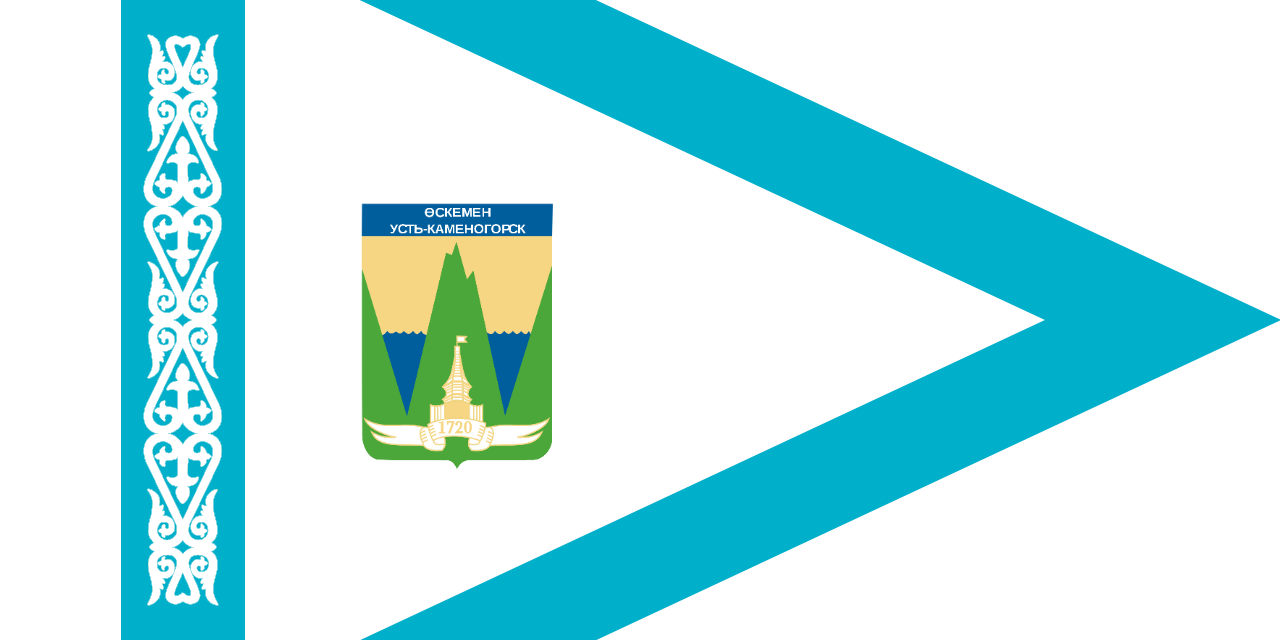
Oskemen

Pavlodar

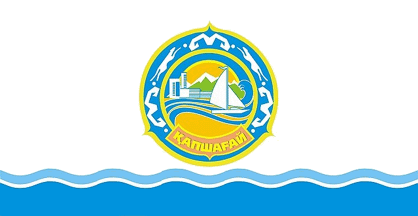
Qonayev

Shymkent

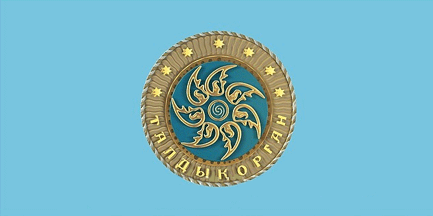
Taldykorgan

=== Kyrgyzstan ===
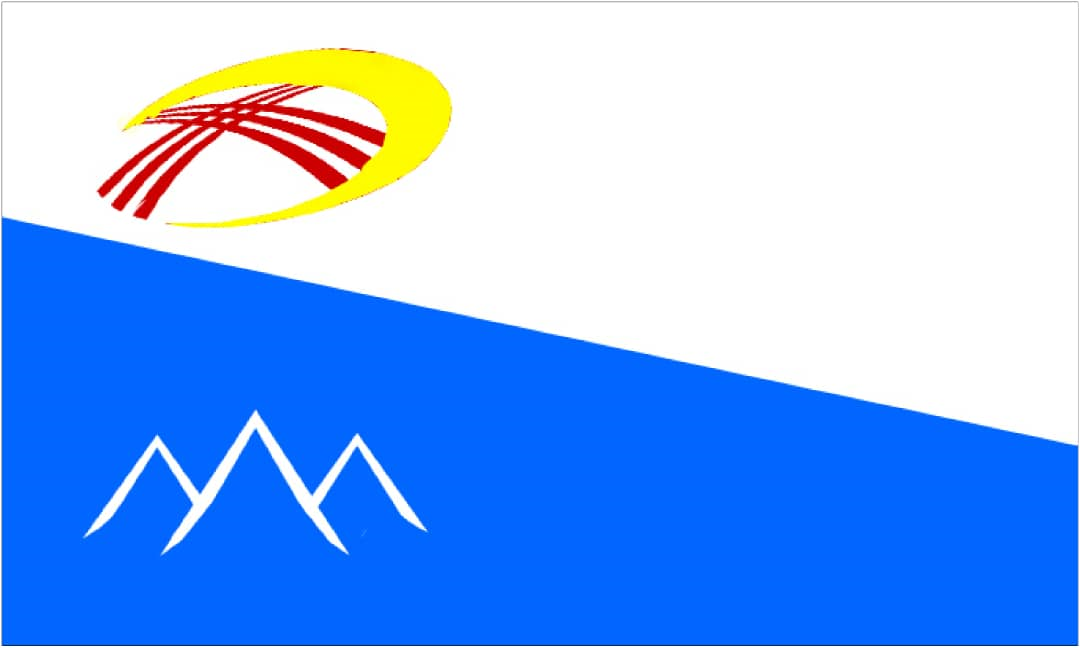
Aydarken

Balykchy

Batken

Bishkek (details)

Cholpon-Ata

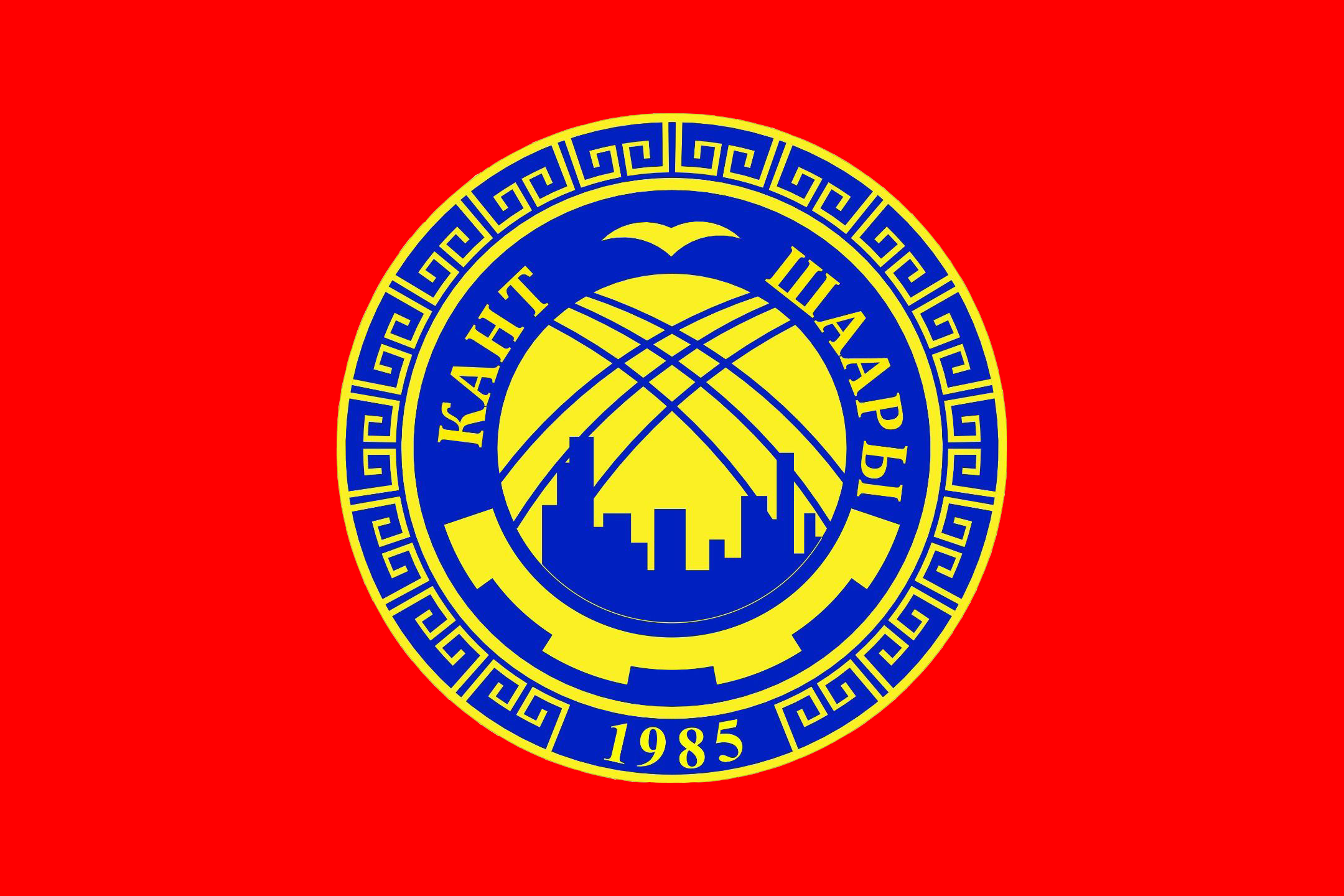
Kant

Kara-Balta

Karakol

Kara-Köl

Kaiyngdy

Manas

Naryn

Orlovka

Osh

Toguz-Bulak

Tokmok

=== Tajikistan ===
Khujand

Zarhok

=== Uzbekistan ===
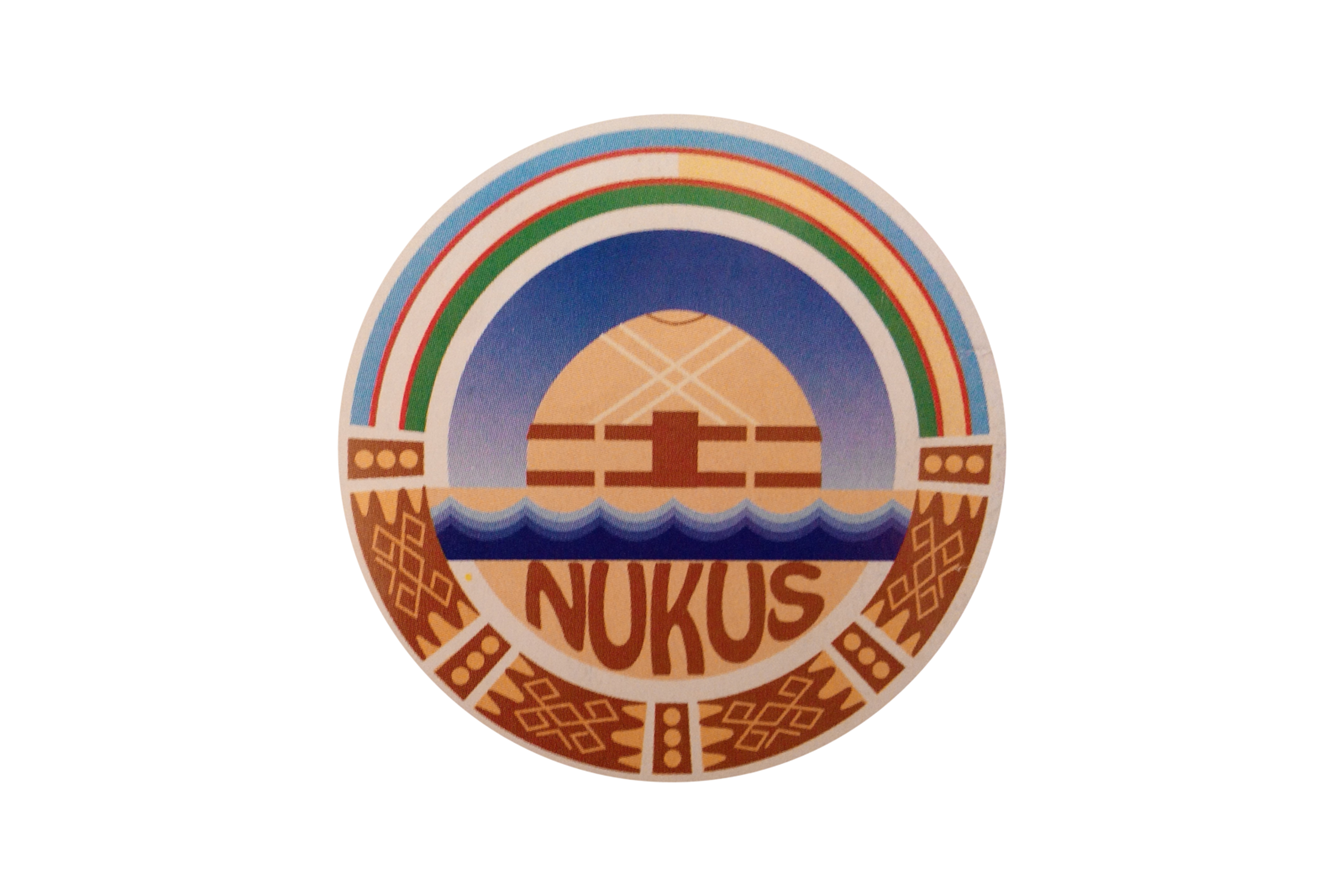
Nukus

Tashkent

== East Asia ==
=== China ===
Hong Kong (details)

Macau (details)

Qiqihar

==== Historical ====
Hong Kong (1871-1876)

Hong Kong (1876-1955)

Hong Kong (1955-1959)

Hong Kong (1959-1997)

Hong Kong (1990, proposed)

Ilhas (1975-1999)

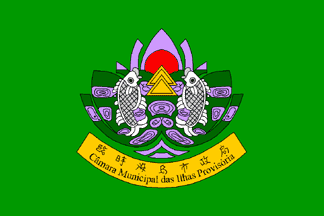
Ilhas (1999-2001)

Kunming (1922-1949)

Macau (1932, proposed)

Macau (1965, proposed)

Macau (1975-1999)

Macau (1975-1999)

Ningbo (1997)

Regional Council (1986-1999)

Shanghai (pre-WWI)

Shanghai (post-WWI-1943)

Urban Council (until 1999)

=== Japan ===
Aguni

Akita

Amagasaki

Amami

Aomori

Asahikawa

Chiba

China

Edogawa

Fujisawa

Fukuoka

Fukushima

Fukuyama

Gifu

Goshogawara

Hachinohe

Hachiōji

Hakodate

Hamamatsu

Hatsukaichi

Higashiōsaka

Himeji

Hirakata

Hiroshima

Ichikawa

Ichinoseki

Iheya

Imabari

Ishigaki

Itabashi

Izena

Kagoshima

Kanazawa

Kanoya

Katsushika

Kawaguchi

Kawasaki

Kirishima

Kitadaitō

Kitakami

Kitakyushu

Kobe

Kochi

Kōtō

Kumamoto

Kumejima

Kunigami

Kurashiki

Kurume

Kyoto

Machida

Matsudo

Matsue

Matsuyama

Minamidaitō

Mishima

Miyakojima

Miyazaki

Morioka

Mutsu

Nagasaki

Nago

Nagoya

Naha

Nakijin

Naruto

Nerima

Niigata

Nishinomiya

Ōdate

Ōita

Okayama

Okinawa

Osaka

Ōta

Otsu

Saga

Sagamihara

Saitama

Sakai

Sakaide

Sakata

Sapporo

Sendai

Setagaya

Shiroishi

Shizuoka

Suginami

Takamatsu

Taketomi

Tanabe

Tarama

Tokushima

Tokyo (details)

Tonaki

Tottori

Toyama

Toyohashi

Toyota

Utsunomiya

Wadomari

Wakayama

Yamagata

Yokohama

Yokosuka

Yokote

Yonaguni

Yoron

Zamami

=== North Korea ===
Sinuiju

=== South Korea ===
Andong

Ansan

Anseong

Anyang

Asan

Boryeong

Bucheon

Busan

Changwon

Cheonan

Cheongju

Chuncheon

Chungju

Daegu

Daejeon

Dangjin

Dongducheon

Donghae

Gangneung

Geoje

Gimcheon

Gimhae

Gimje

Gimpo

Gongju

Goyang

Gumi

Gunpo

Gunsan

Guri

Gwacheon

Gwangju, Gyeonggi

Gwangju, Honam

Gwangmyeong

Gwangyang

Gyeongju

Gyeongsan

Gyeryong

Hanam

Hwaseong

Icheon

Iksan

Incheon

Jecheon

Jeongeup

Jeonju

Jinju

Miryang

Mokpo

Mungyeong

Naju

Namwon

Namyangju

Nonsan

Osan

Paju

Pocheon

Pohang

Pyeongtaek

Sacheon

Samcheok

Sangju

Sejong

Seongnam

Seosan

Seoul

Siheung

Sokcho

Suncheon

Suwon

Taebaek

Tongyeong

Uijeongbu

Uiwang

Ulsan

Wonju

Yangju

Yangsan

Yeoju

Yeongcheon

Yeongju

Yeosu

Yongin

==== Historical ====
Busan (1962-1995)

Busan (1995-2023)

Daegu (1977-1996)

Daegu (1996-2001)

Daegu (2001)

Daejeon (1972-1995)

Gwangju, Honam (1986-1988)

Gwangju, Honam (1988-2000)

Incheon (1977-1996)

Jeju City (2000-2006)

Seogwipo (1981-2006)

Seoul (1946-1996)

Suncheon (2001-2024)

Suwon (1999-2022)

Yeongcheon (1981-1995)

=== Mongolia ===
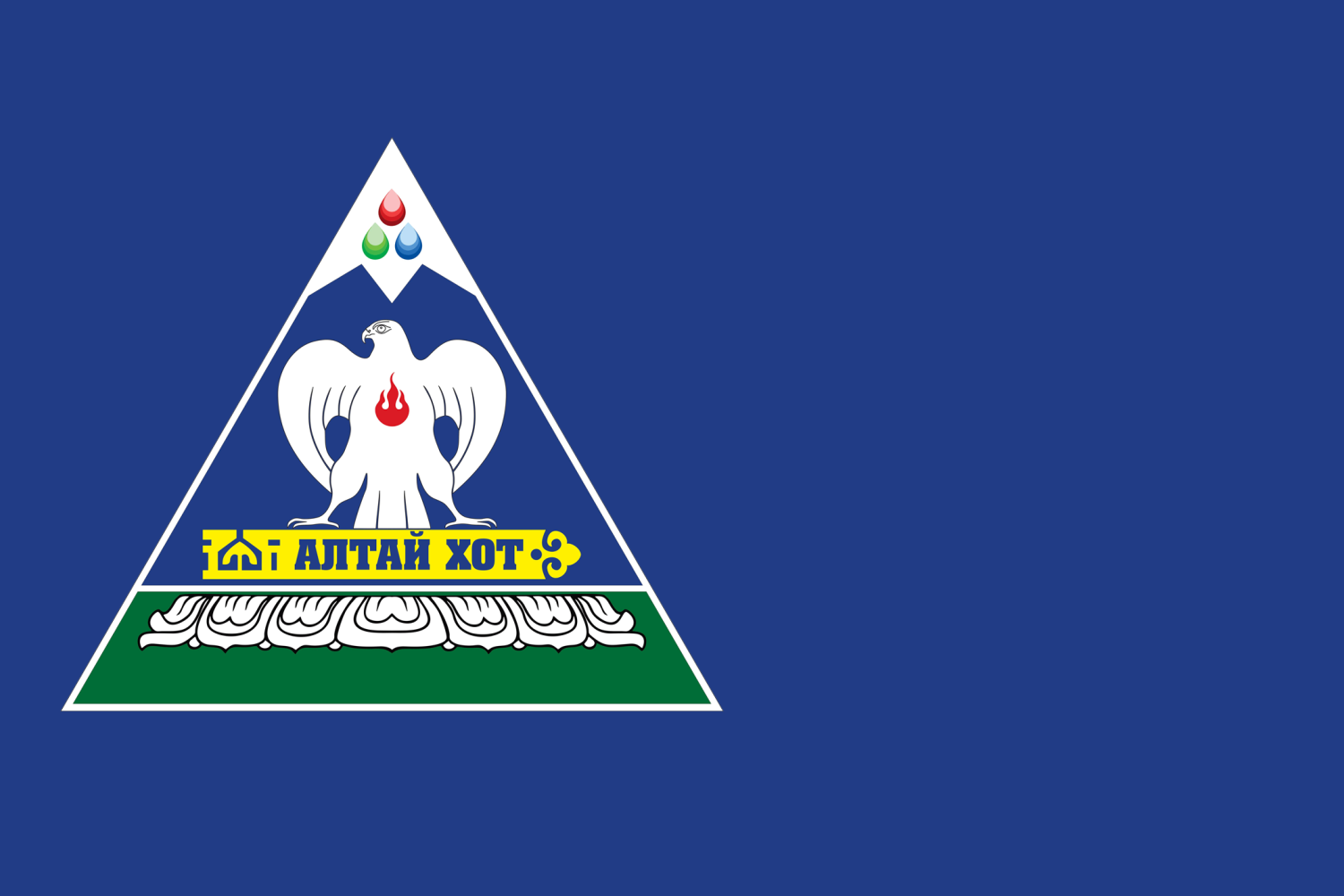
Altai

Bagakhangai

Baganuur

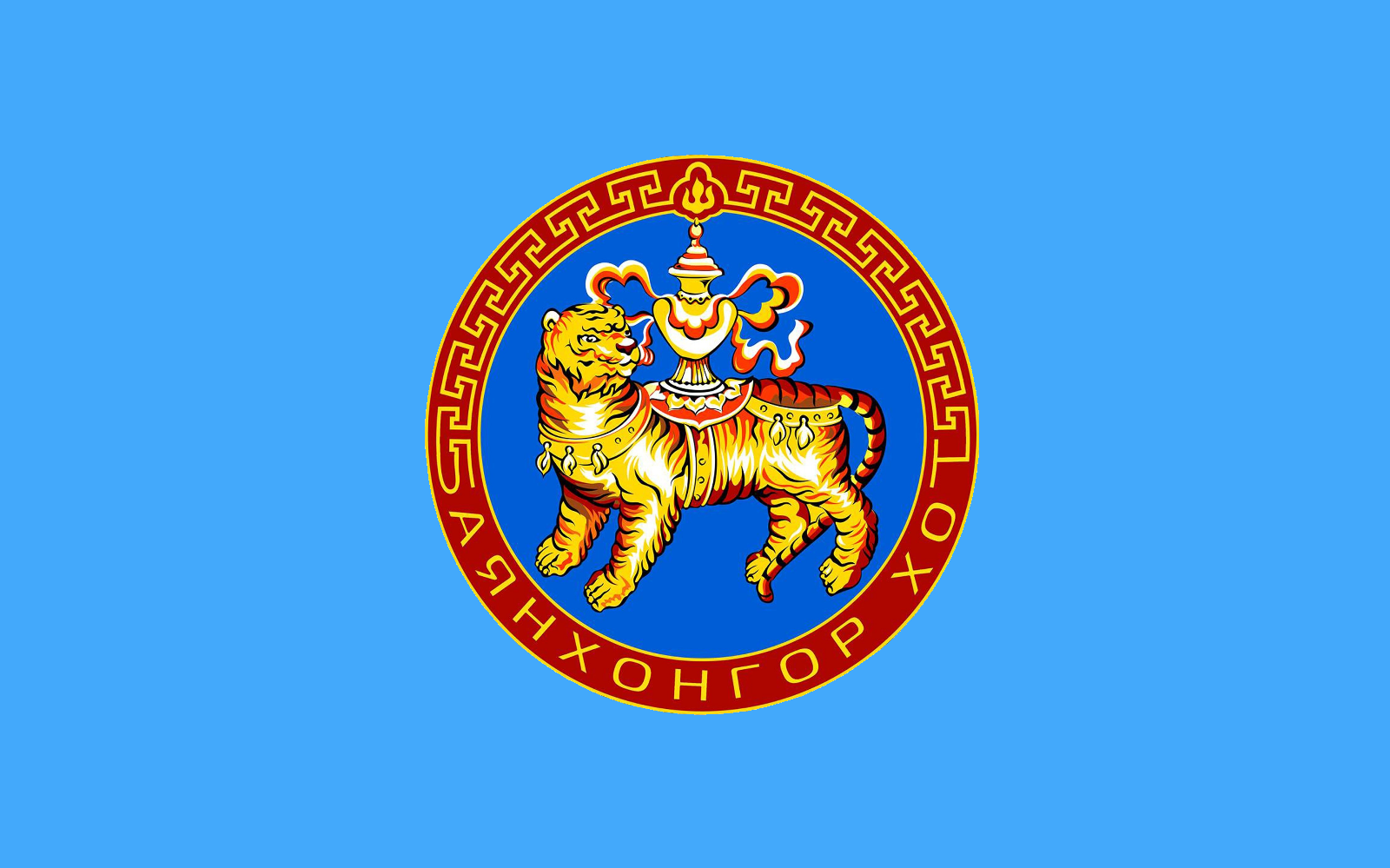
Bayankhongor

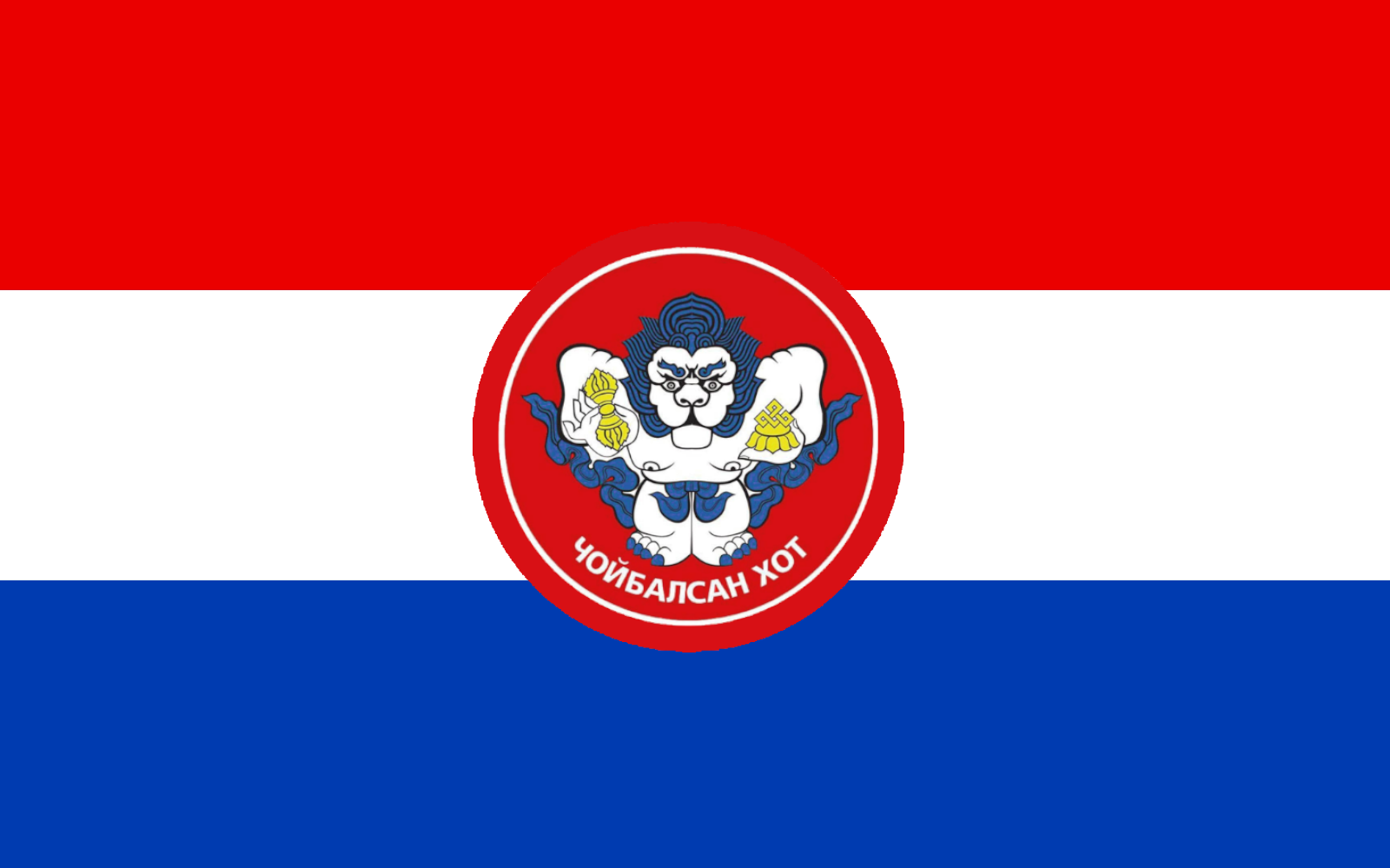
Choibalsan

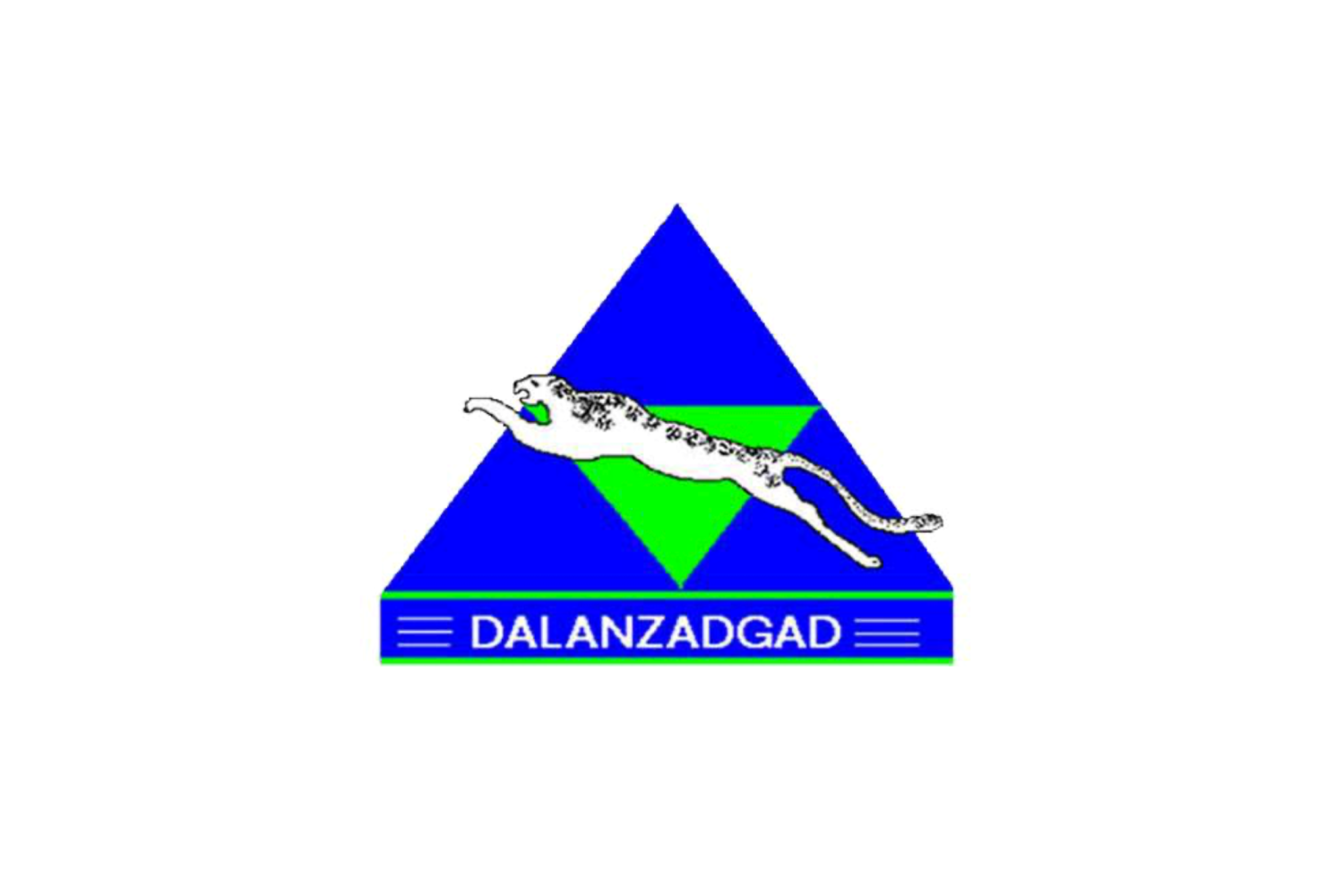
Dalanzadgad

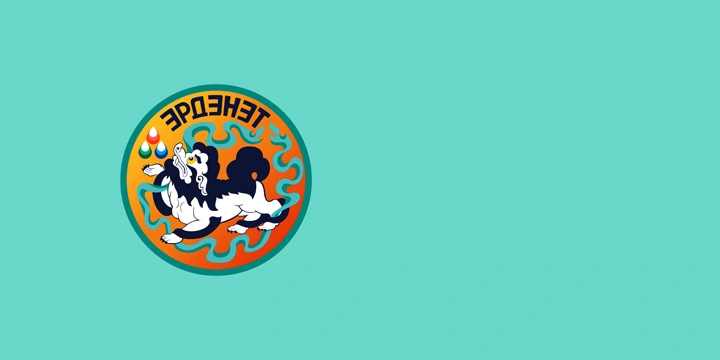
Erdenet

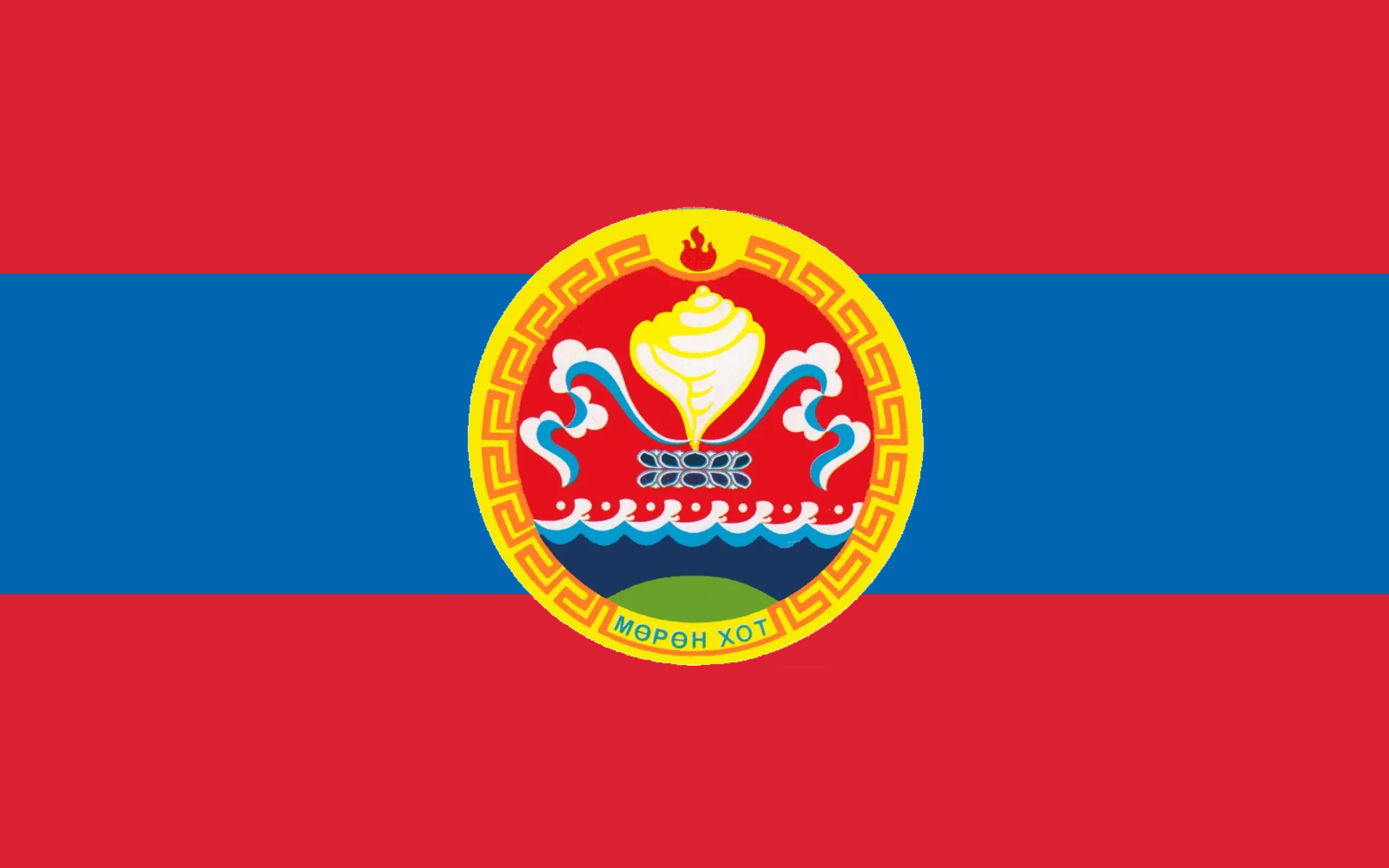
Mörön

Nalaikh

Ulaanbaatar

=== Taiwan ===
Chiayi

Hsinchu

Kaohsiung

Keelung

New Taipei City

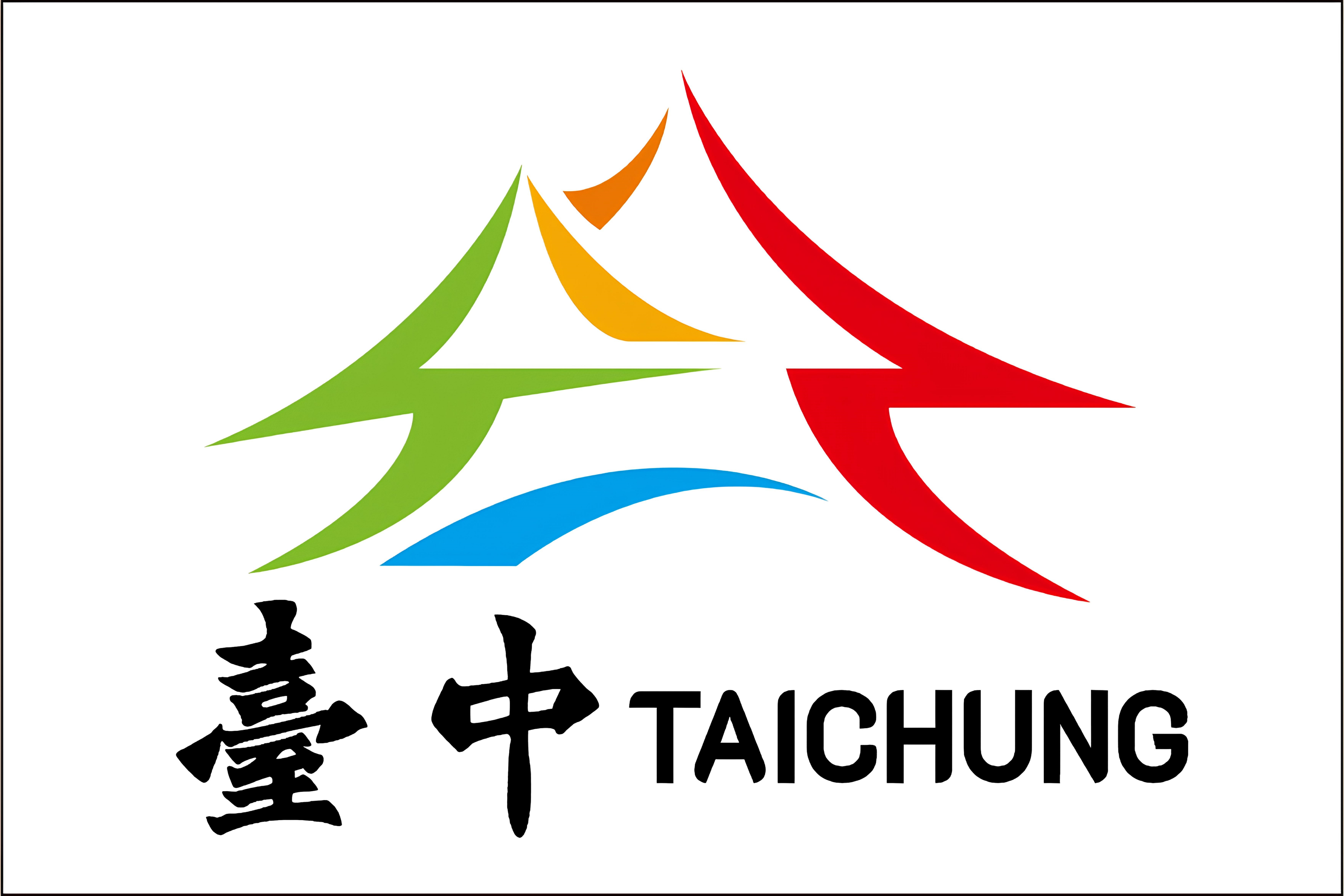
Taichung (details)

Tainan

Taipei

Taoyuan

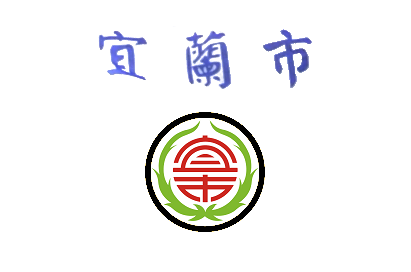
Yilan City

==== Historical ====
Kaohsiung (1974-2009)

New Taipei City (1980s-1999)

New Taipei City (1999-2006)

New Taipei City (2006-2010)

Taichung (1945-2025)

Tainan (1978-2010)

Taipei (1981-2010)

== South Asia ==
=== Afghanistan ===
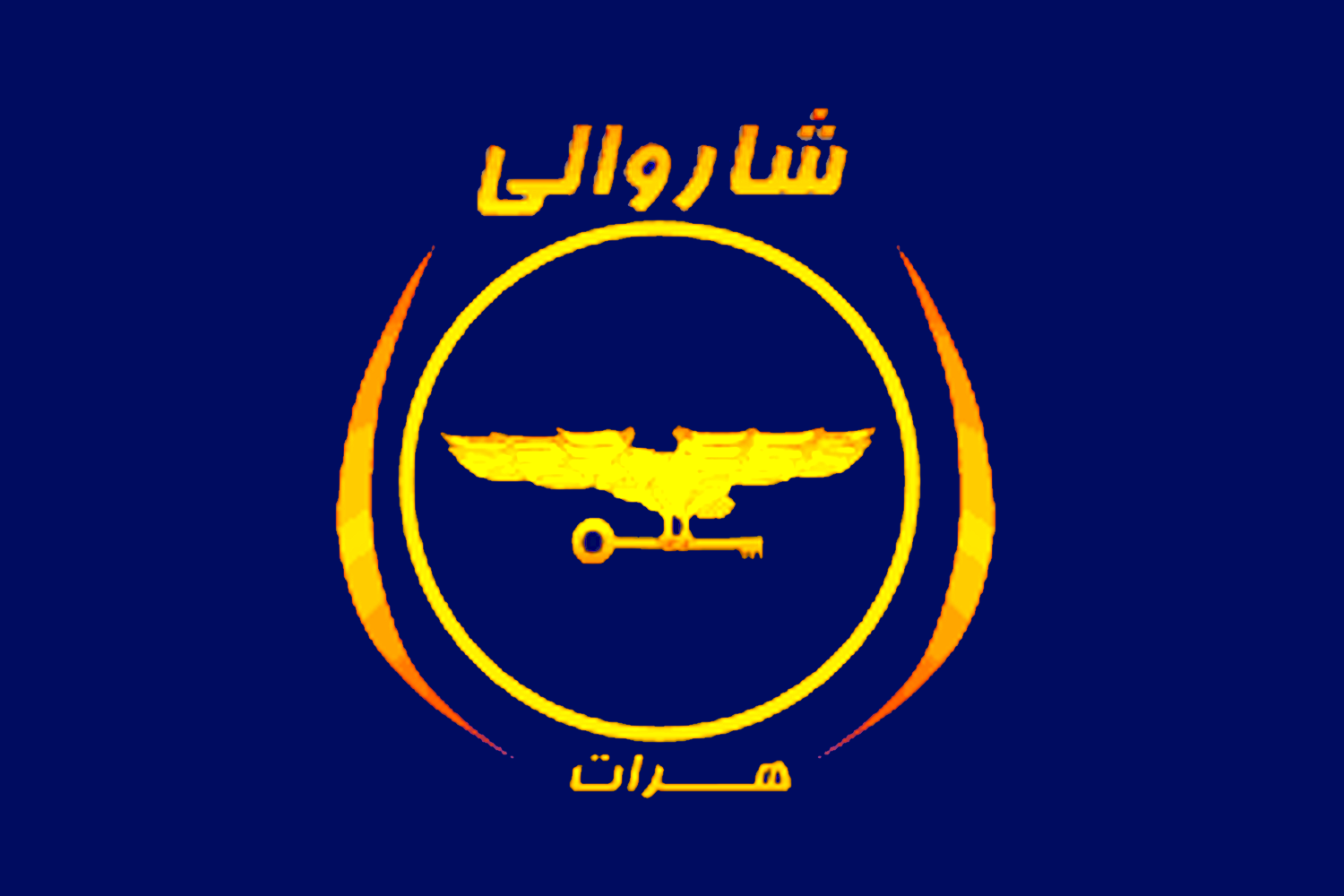
Herat

Kabul

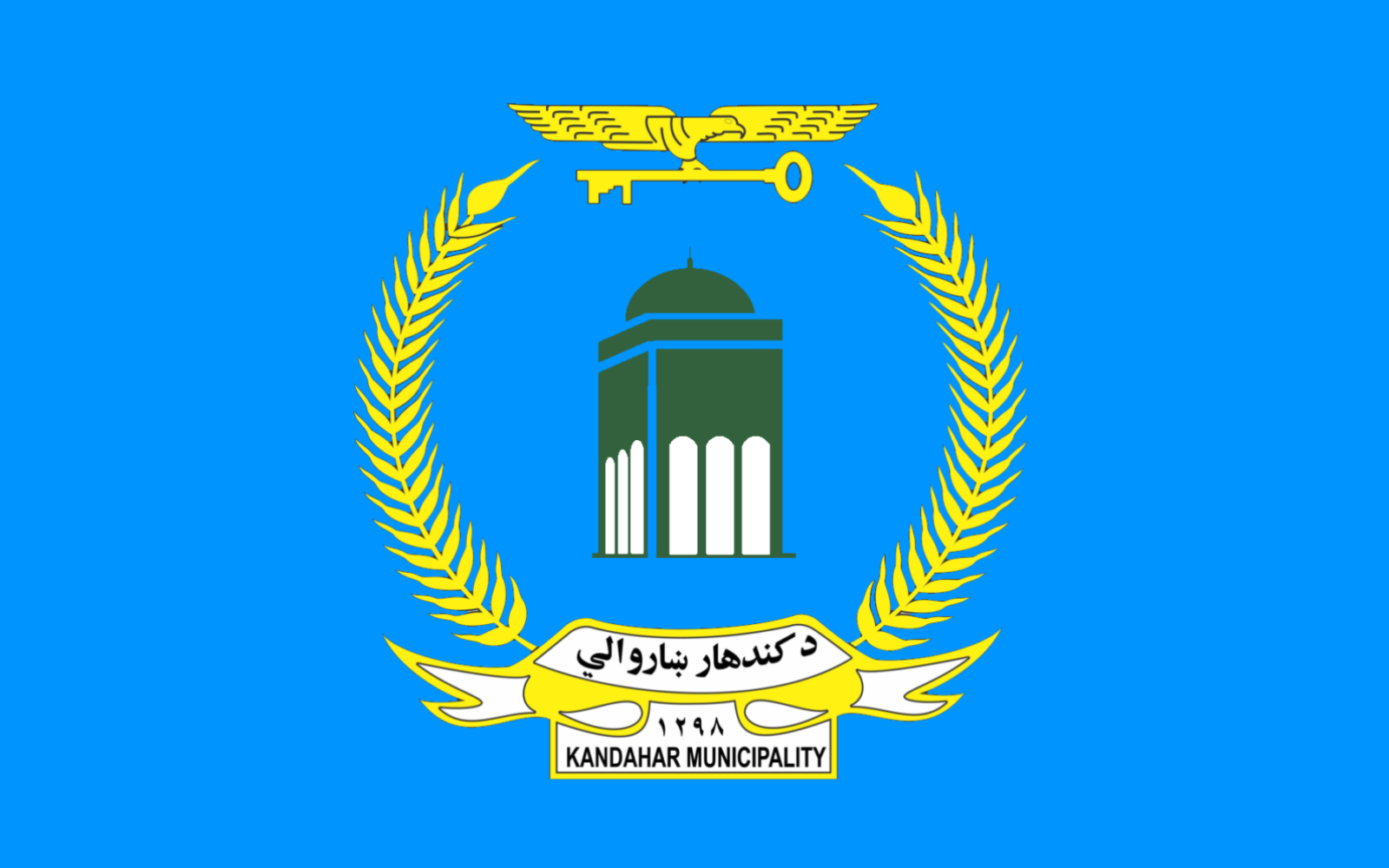
Kandahar

=== India ===
Chandigarh

Delhi

New Delhi

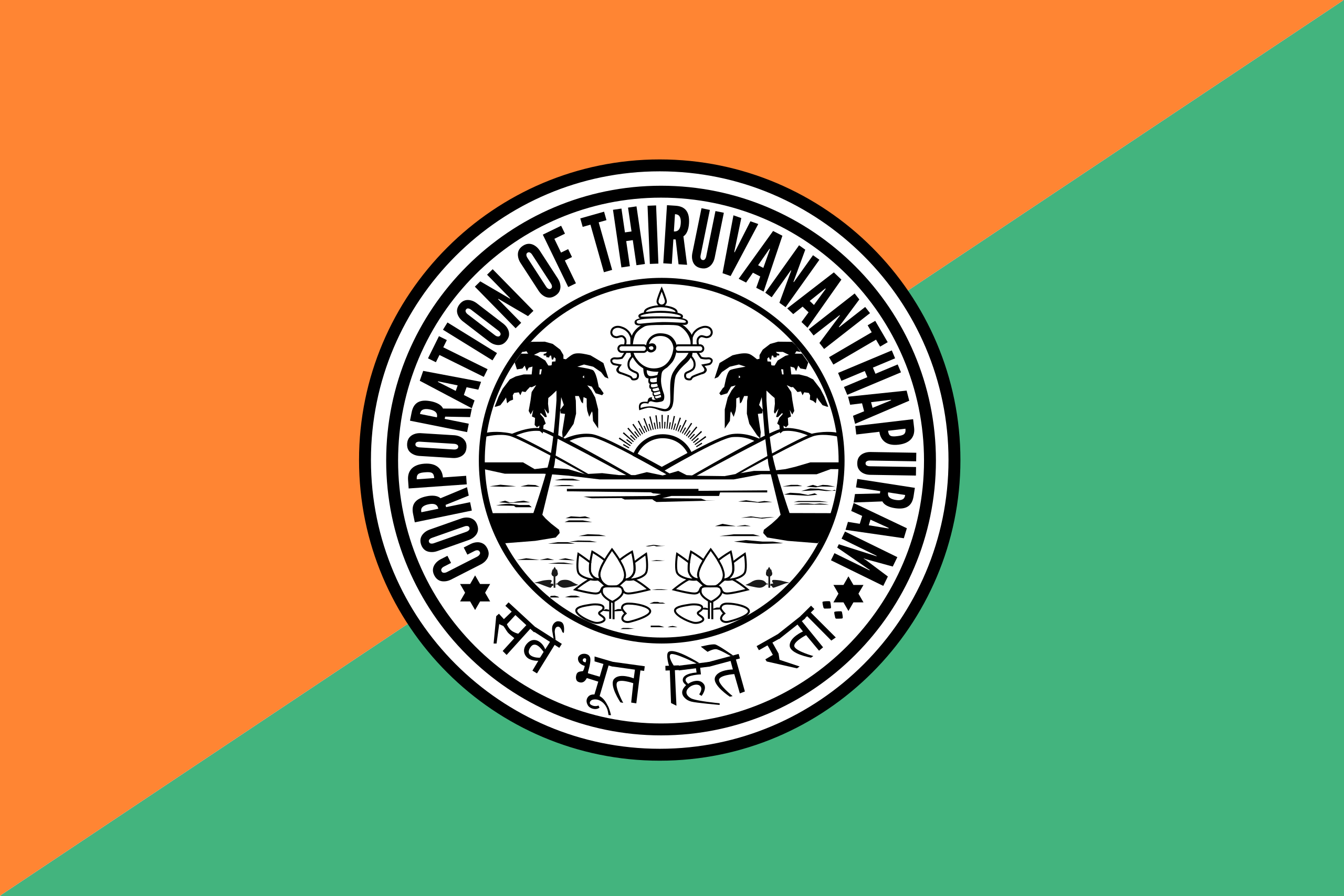
Thiruvananthapuram

==== Historical ====
Junagadh (until 1947)

=== Nepal ===
Kathmandu

=== Pakistan ===
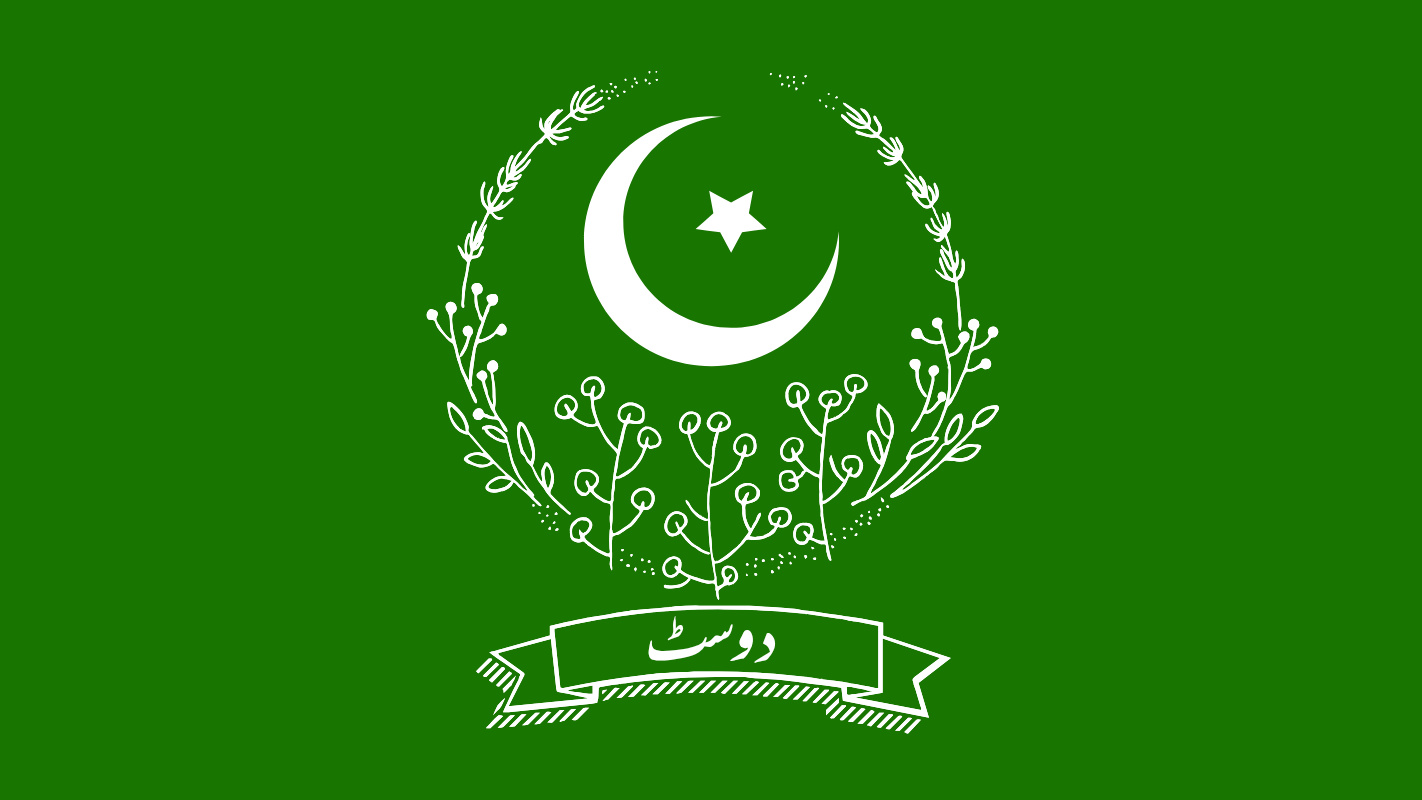
Dosut

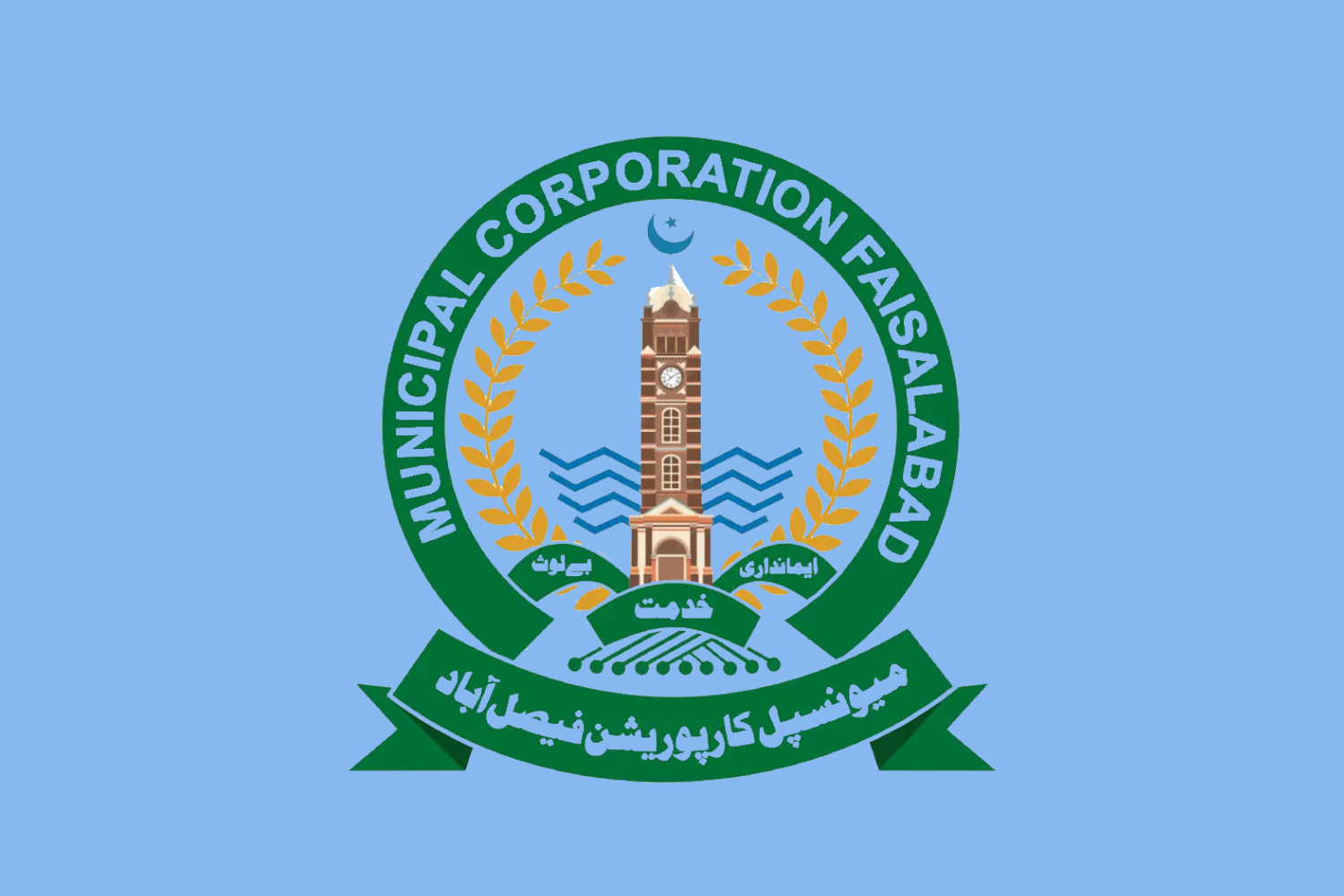
Faisalabad

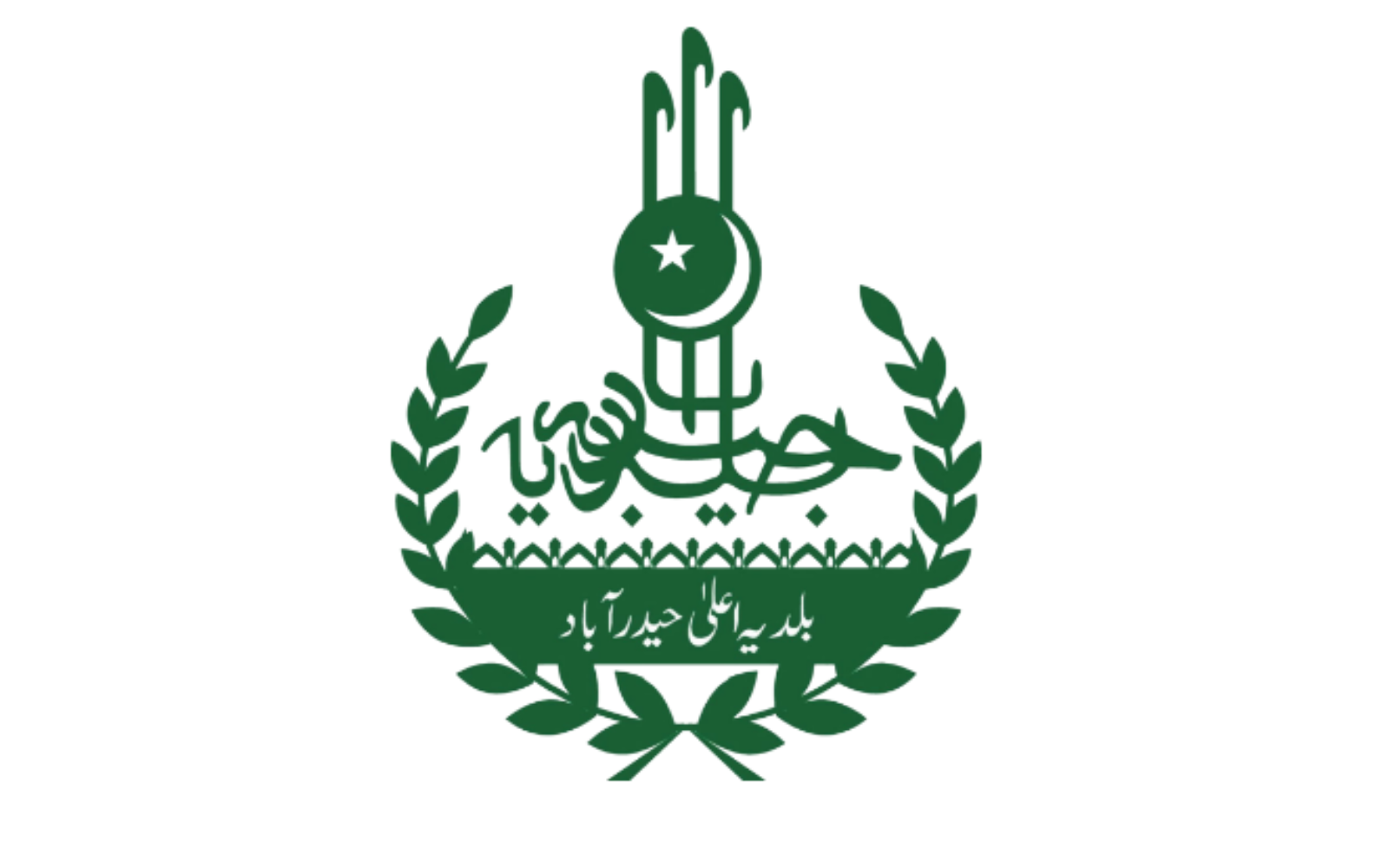
Hyderabad

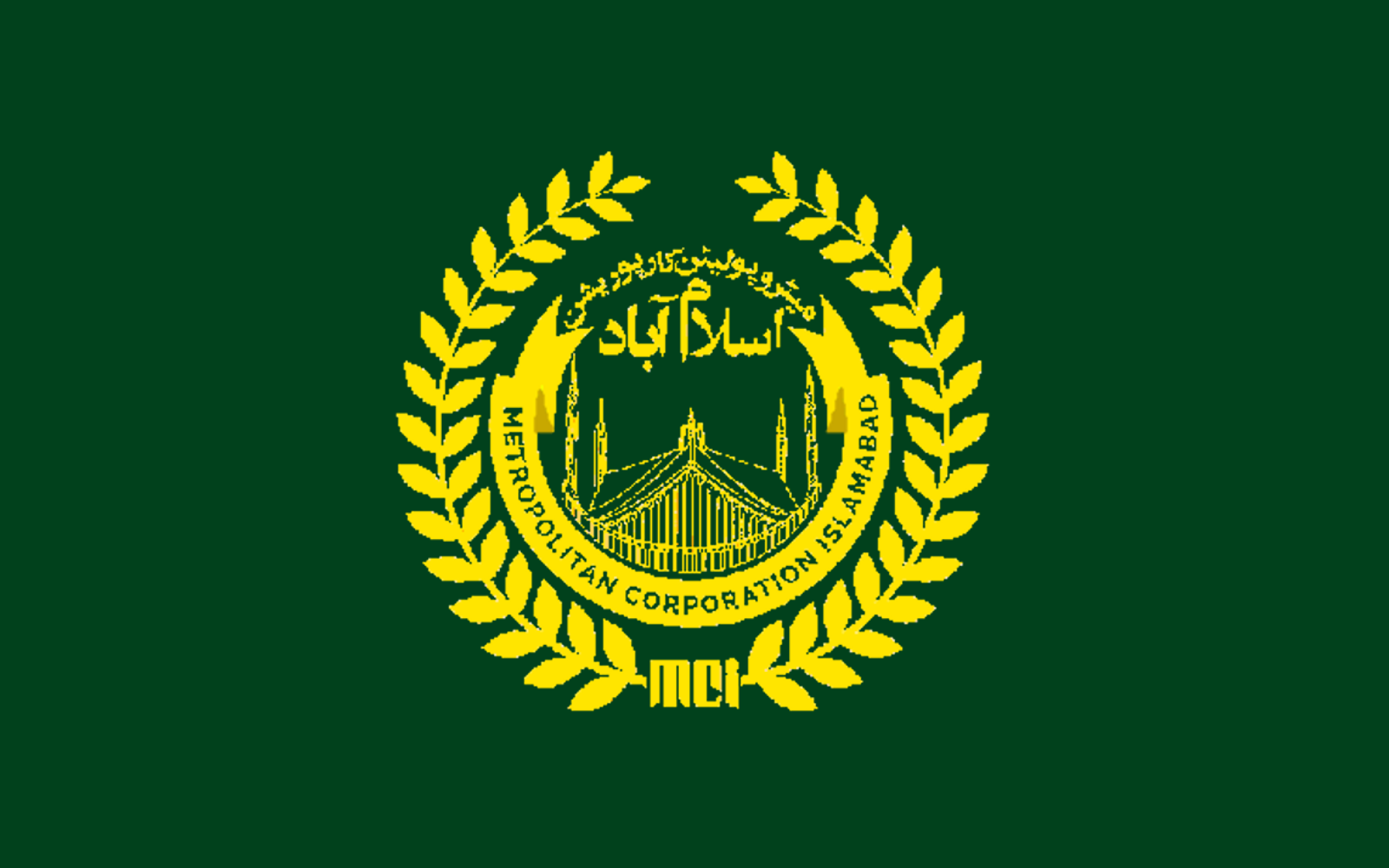
Islamabad

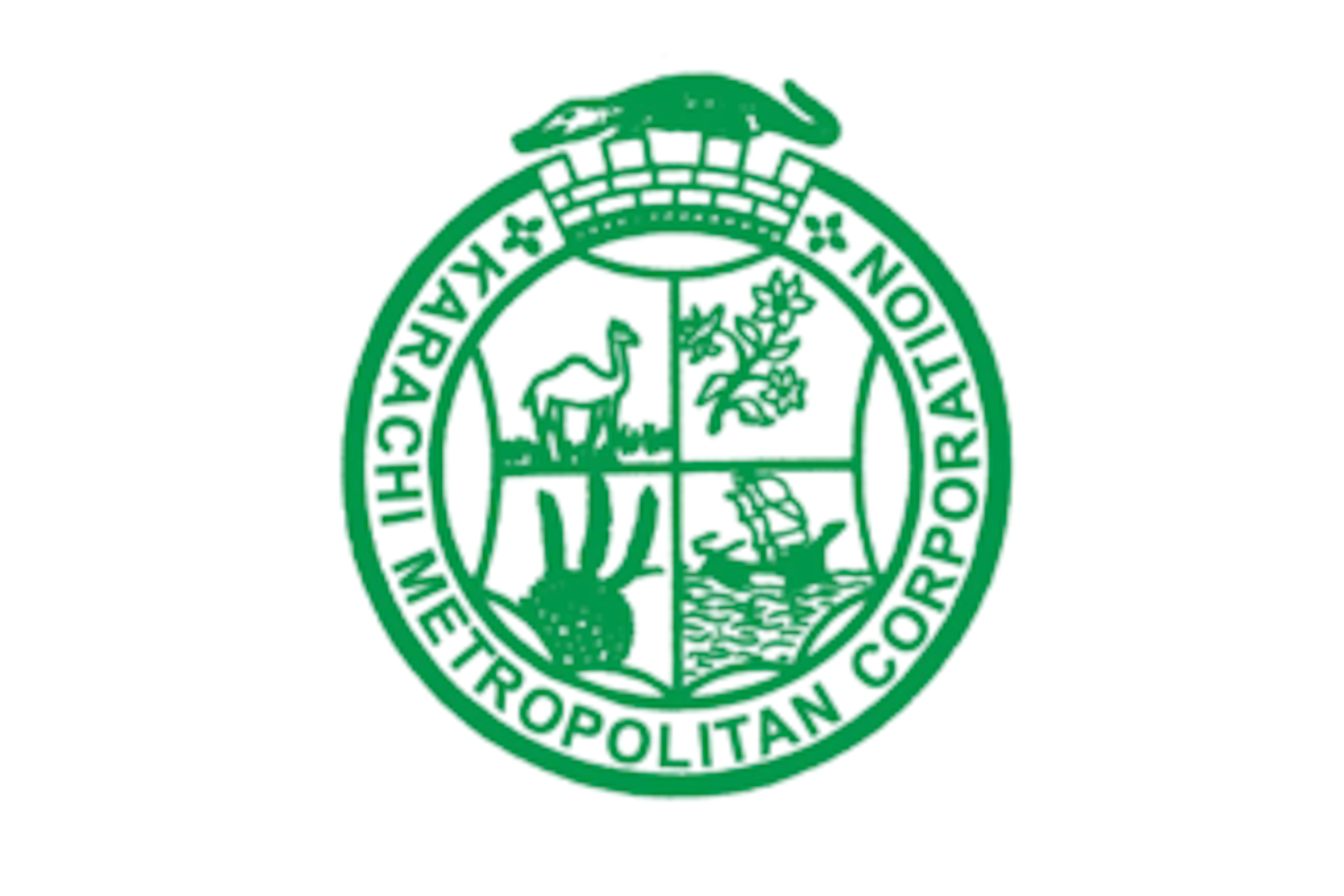
Karachi

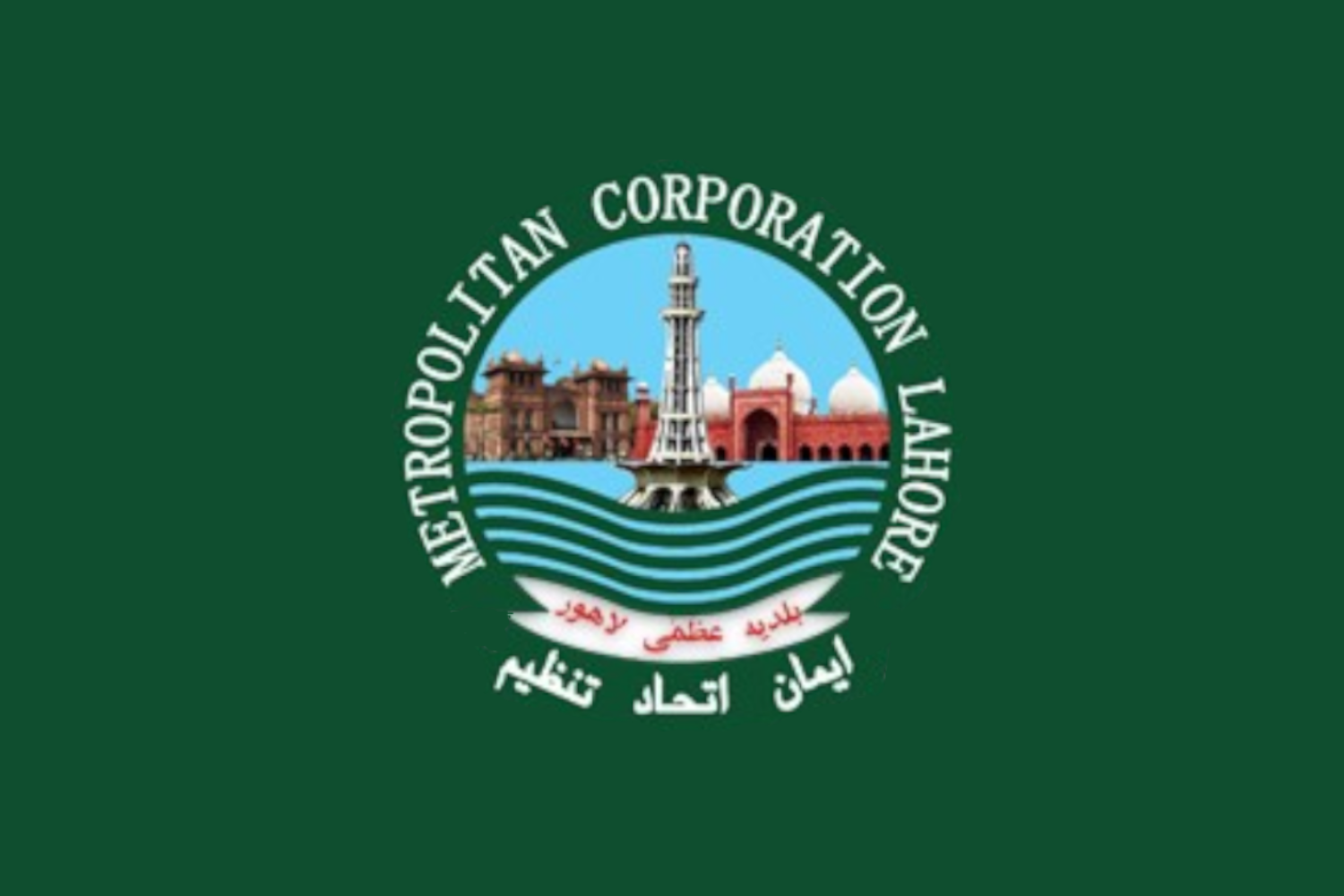
Lahore

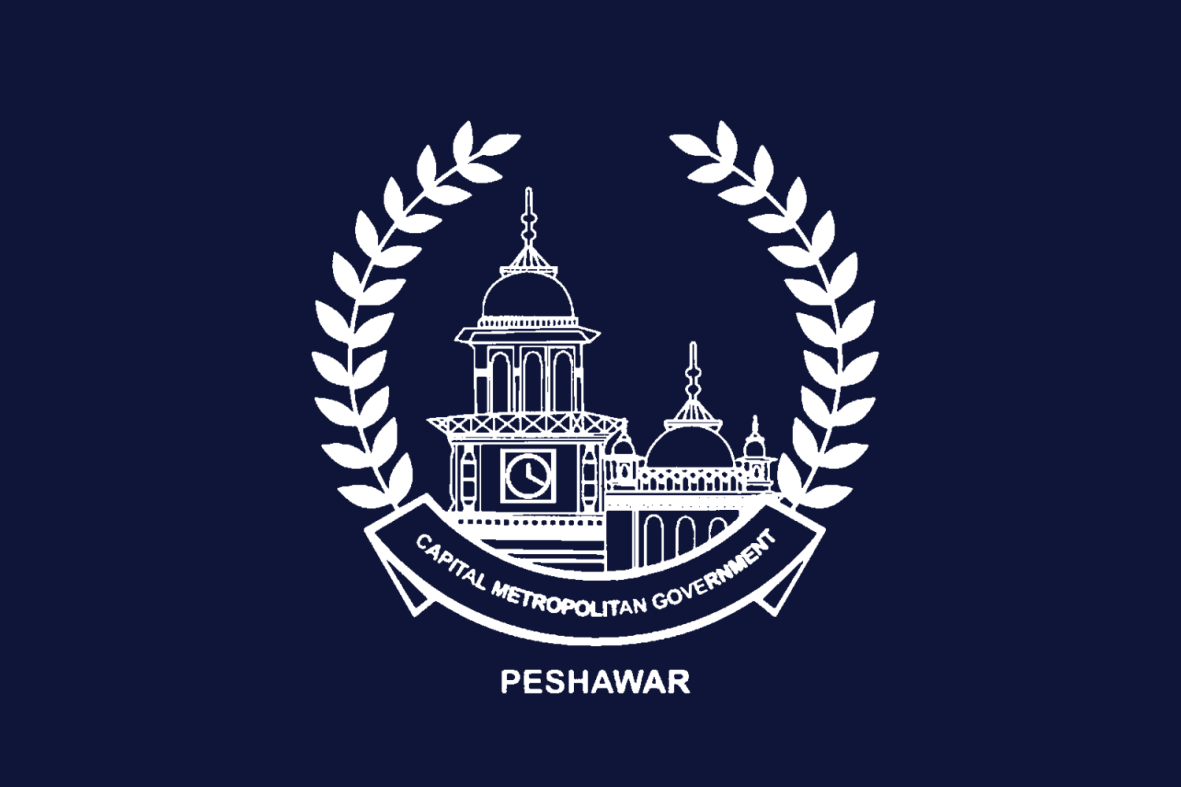
Peshawar

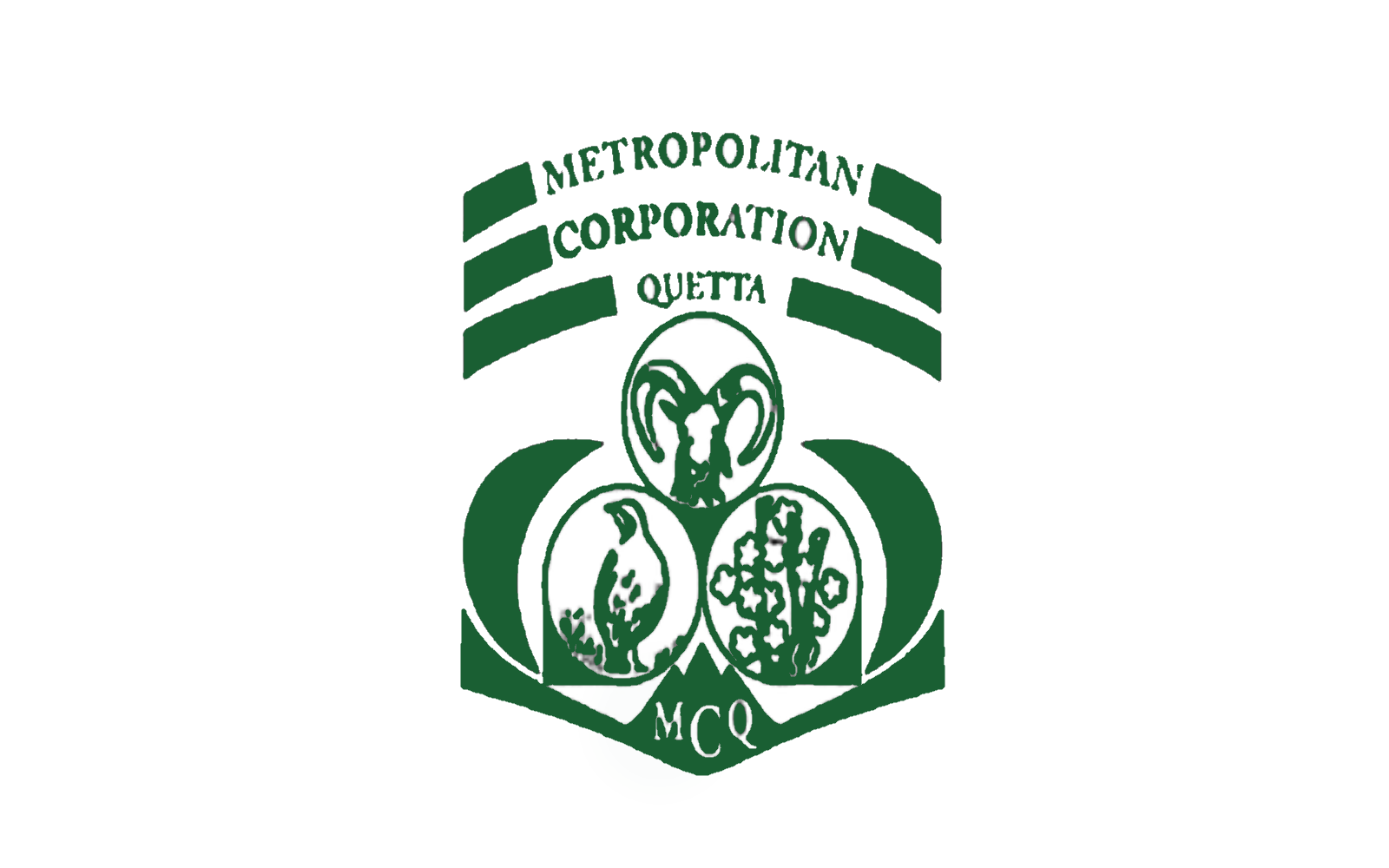
Quetta

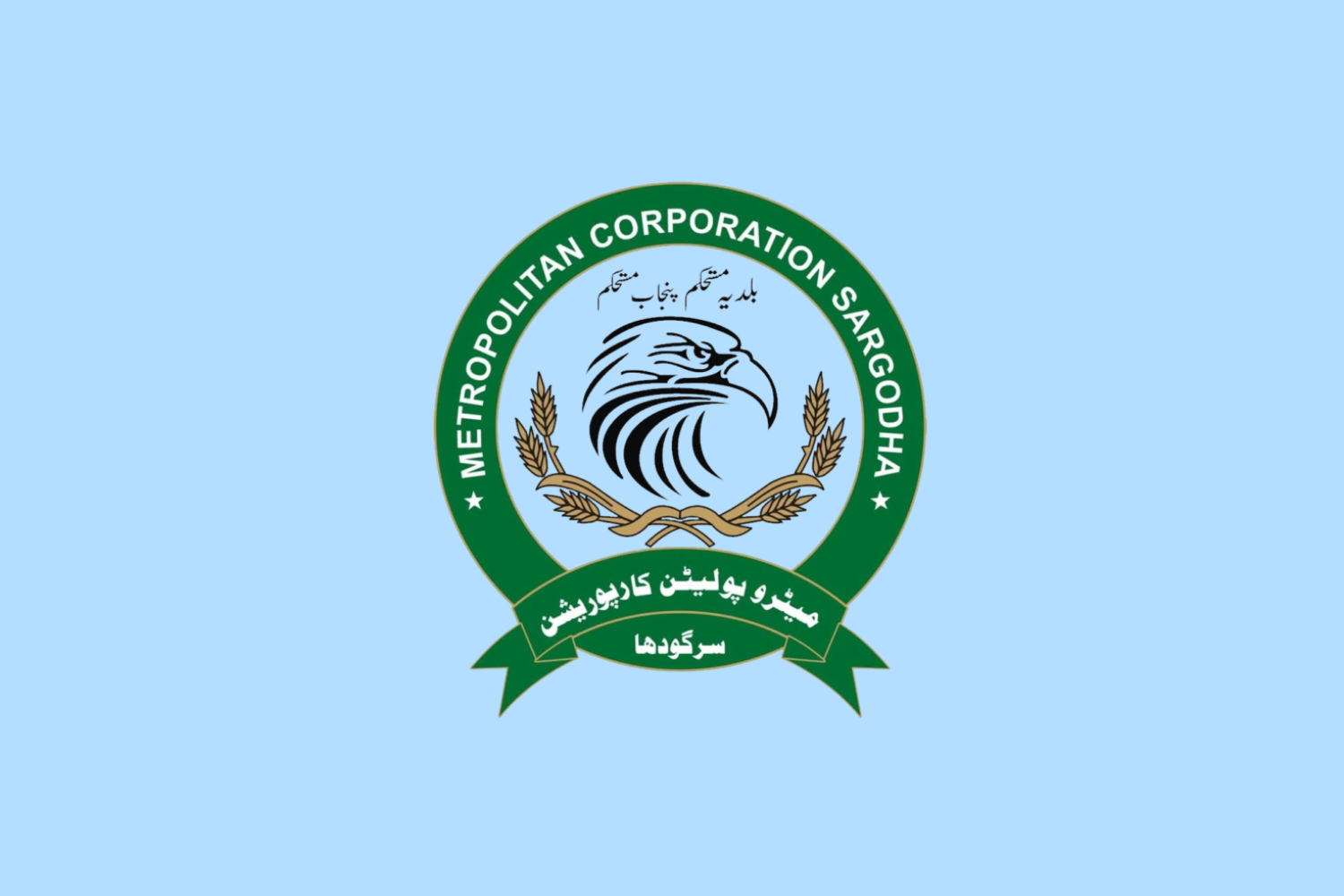
Sargodha

=== Sri Lanka ===
Colombo

== Southeast Asia ==
=== Indonesia ===
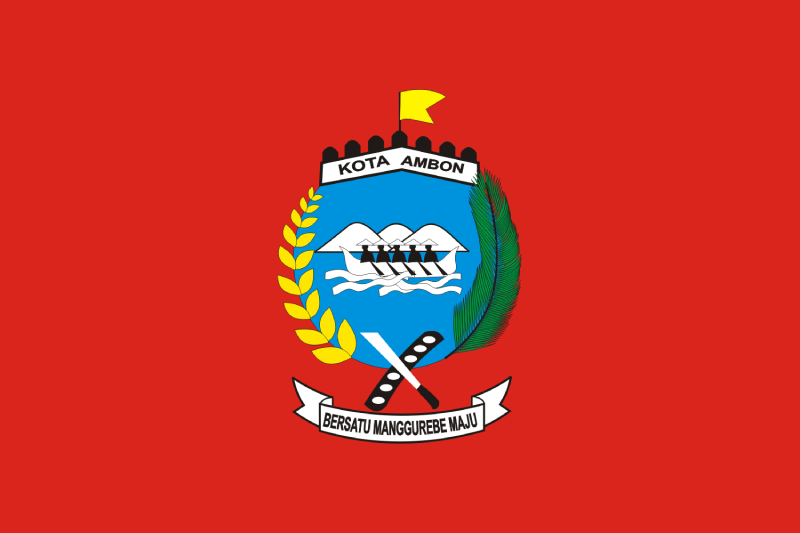
Ambon

Balikpapan

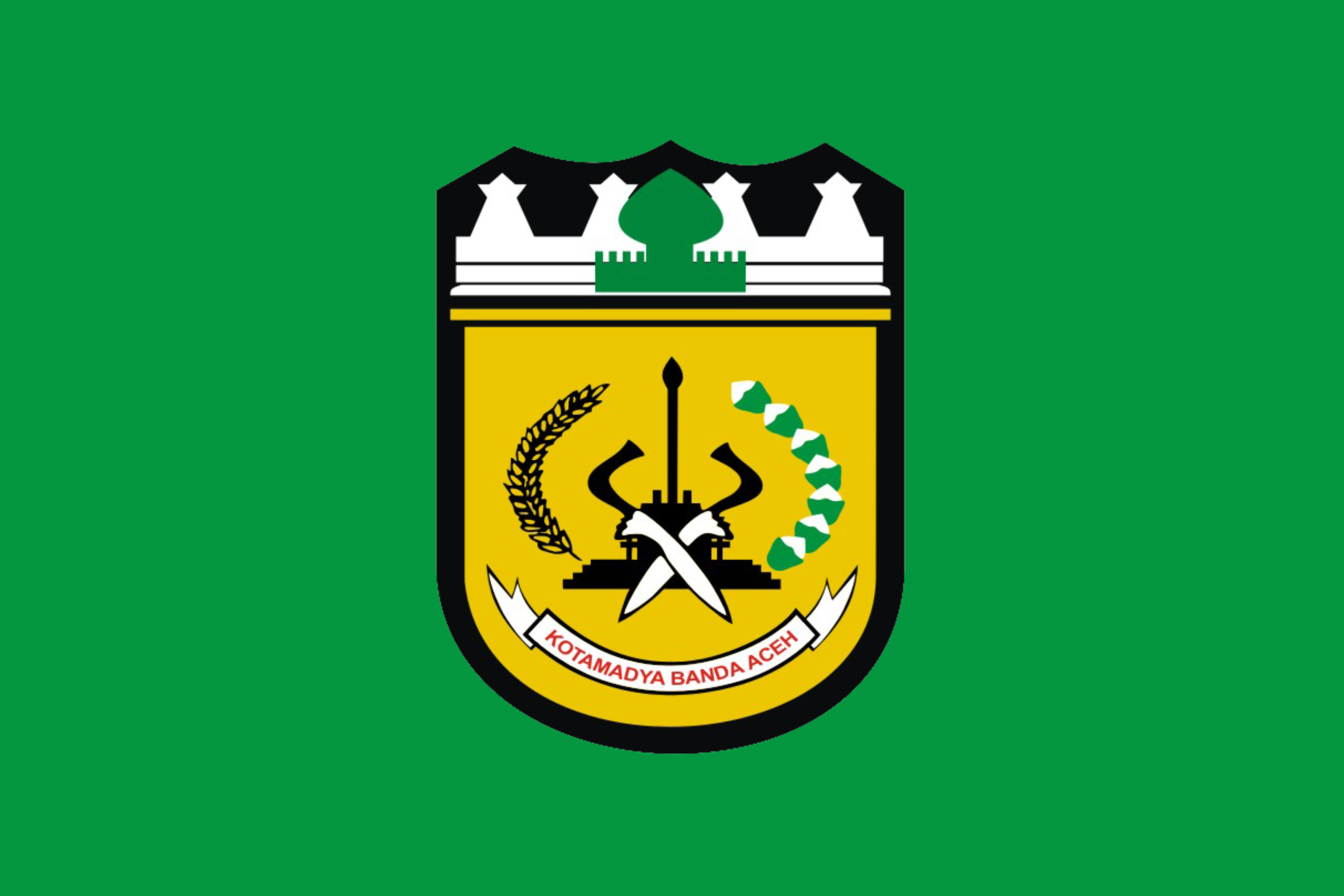
Banda Aceh

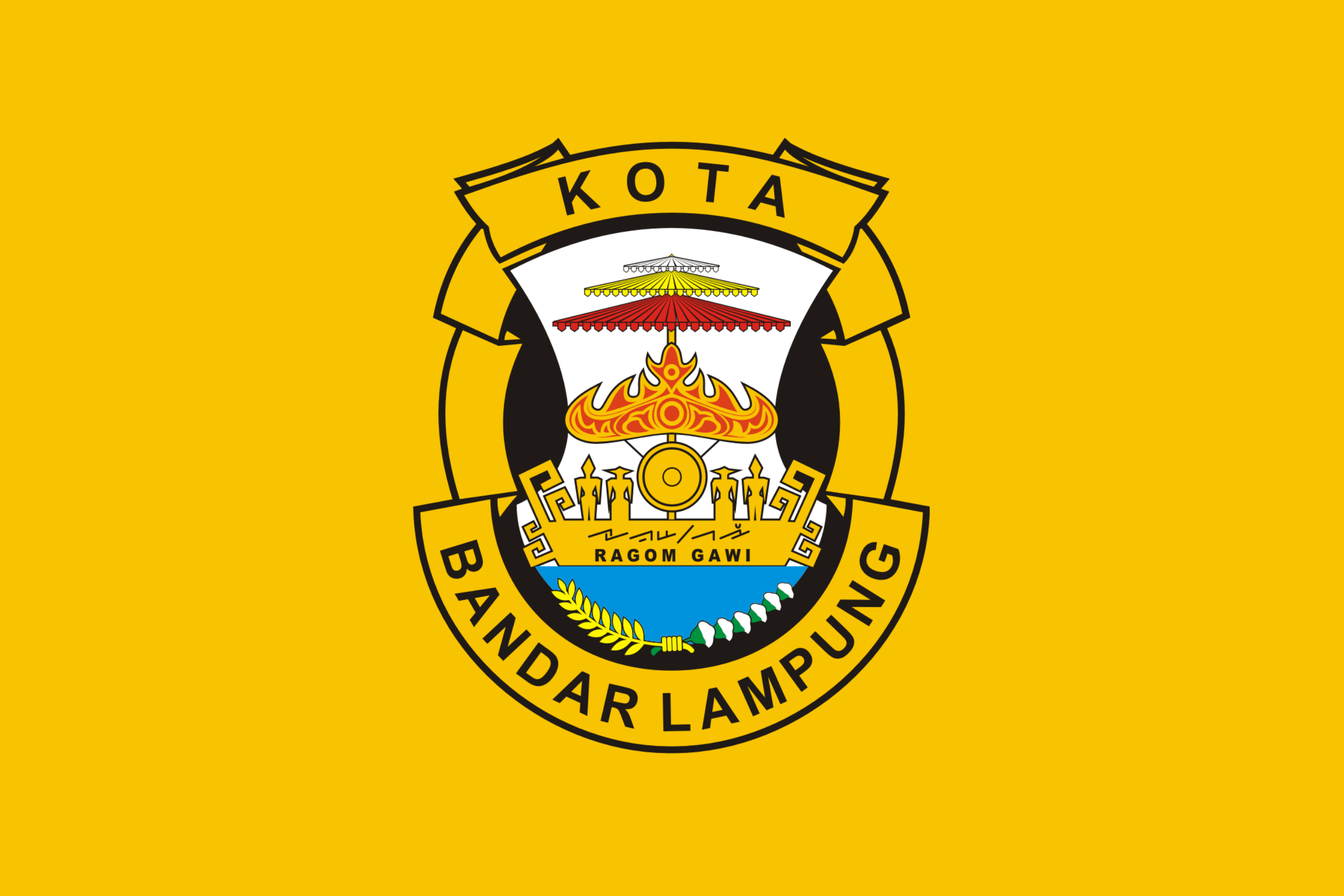
Bandar Lampung

Bandung (details)

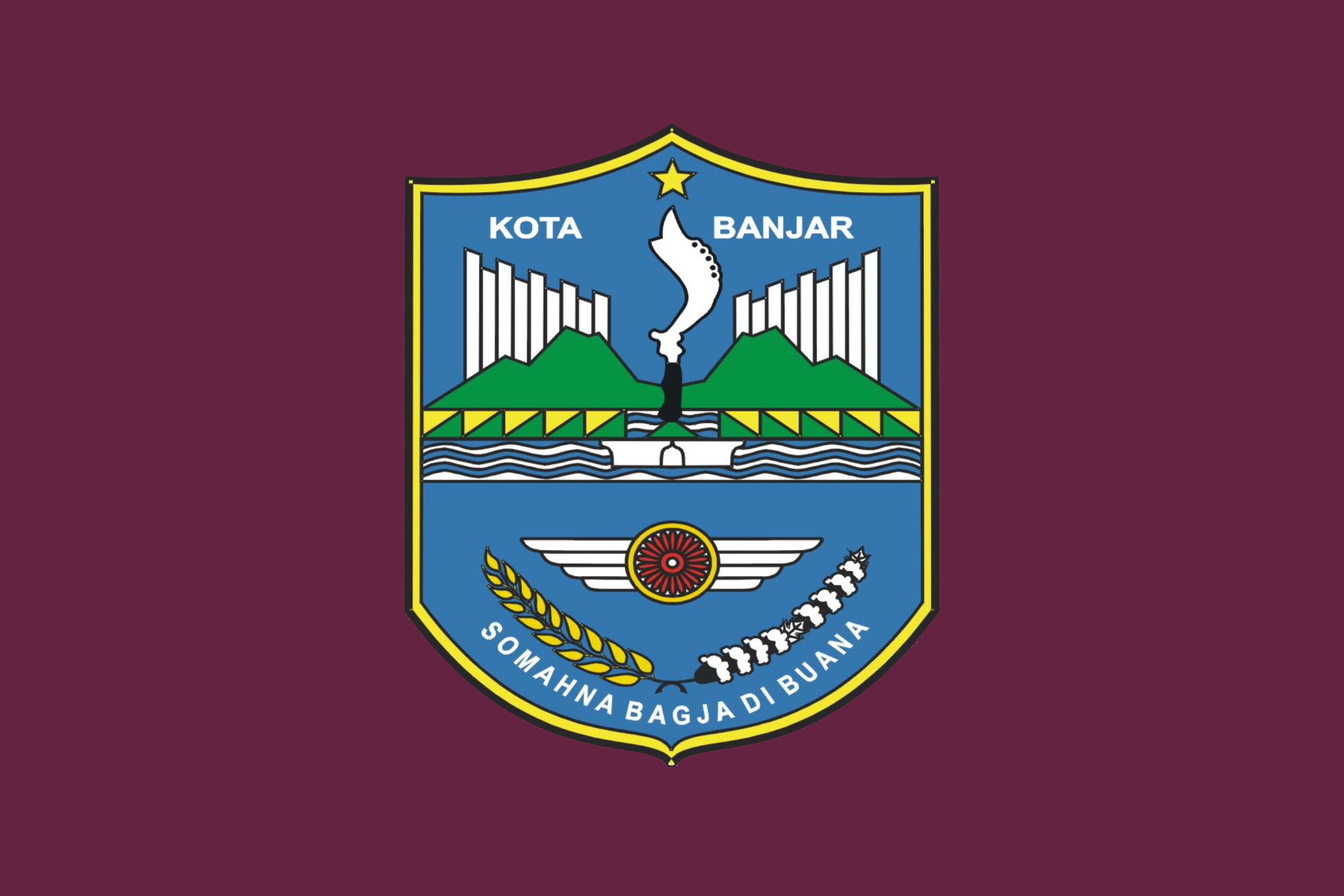
Banjar

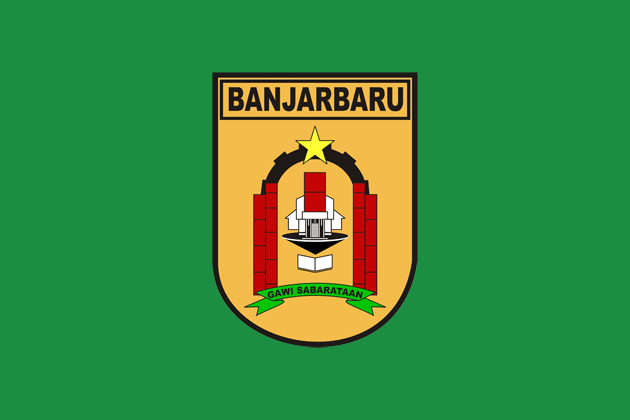
Banjarbaru

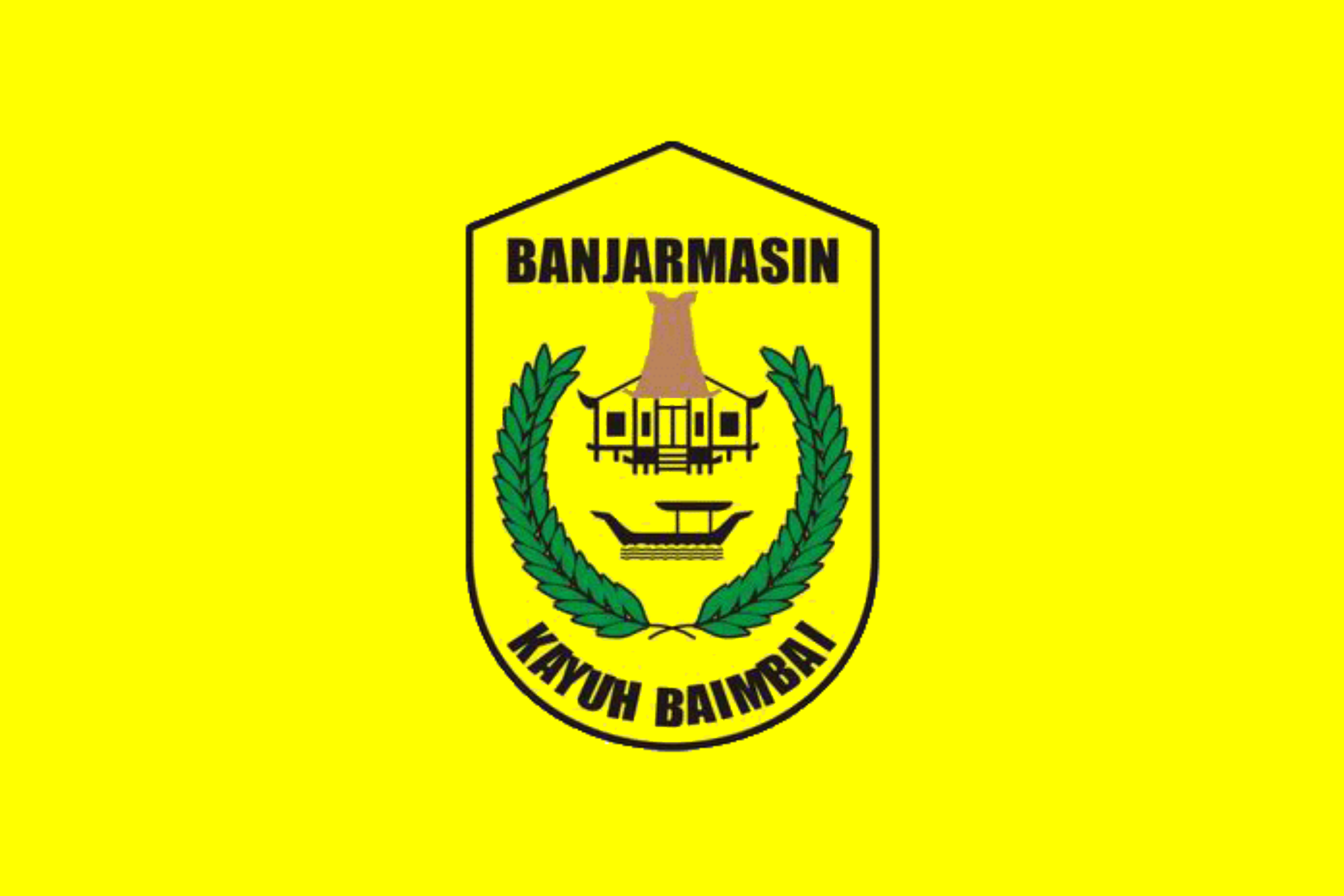
Banjarmasin

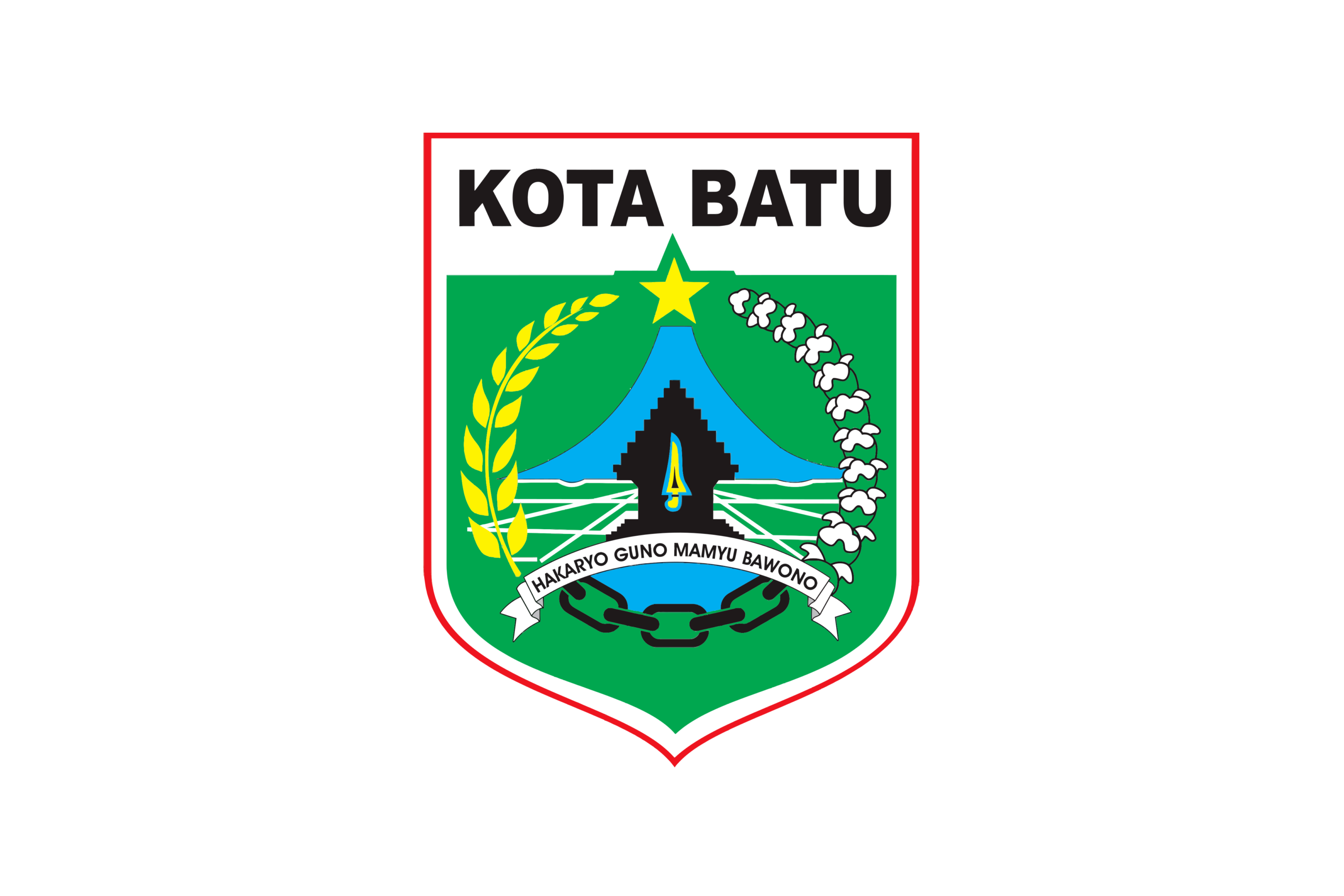
Batu

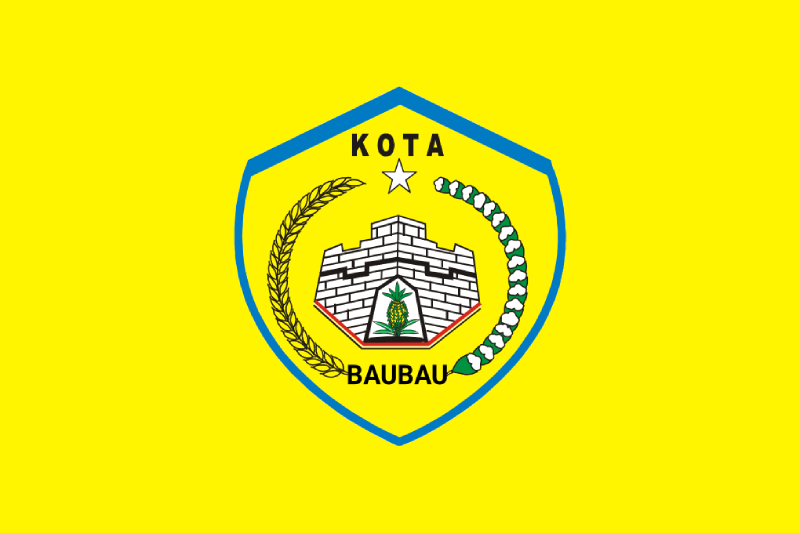
Baubau

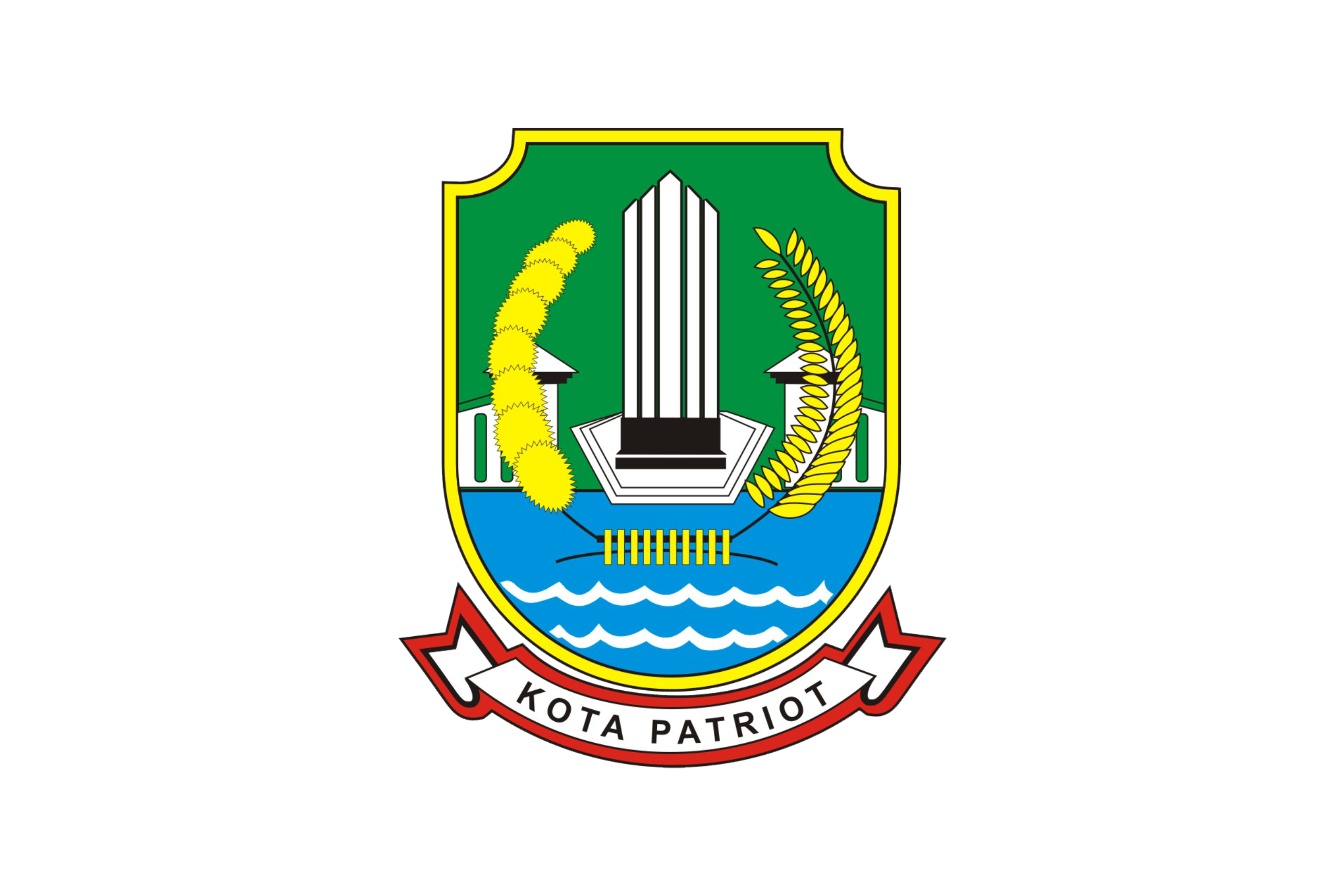
Bekasi

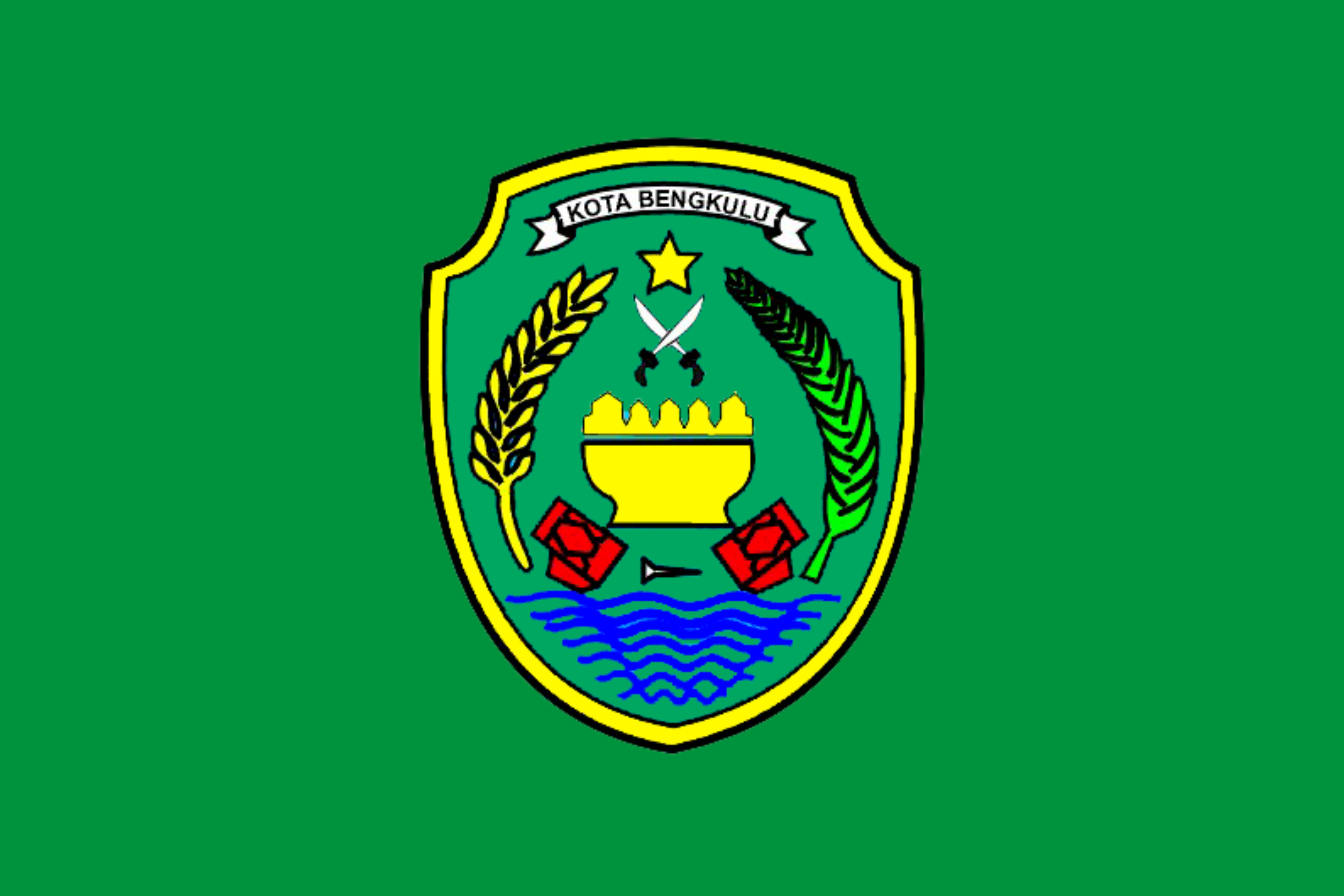
Bengkulu

Bogor

Bontang

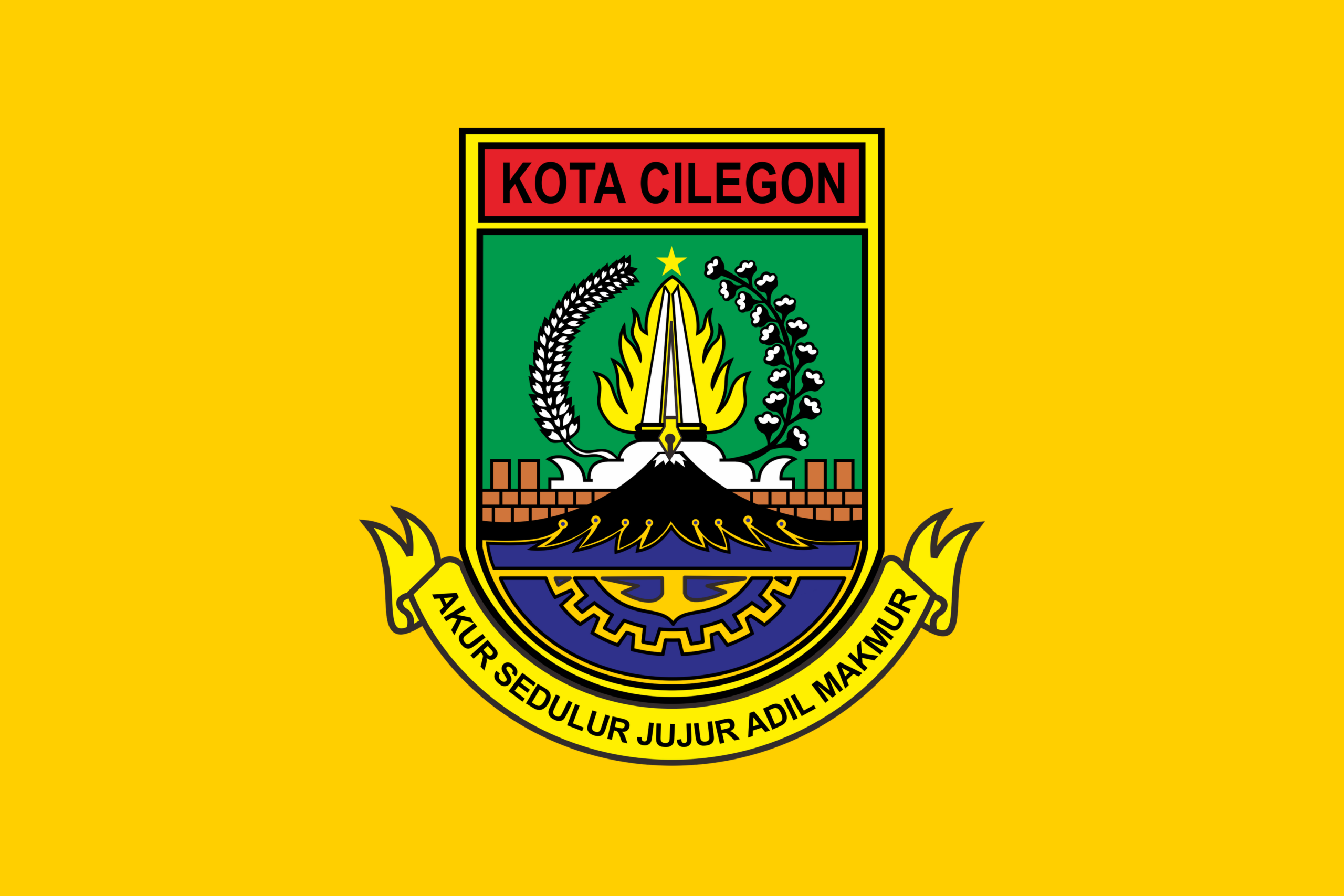
Cilegon

Cimahi

Cirebon

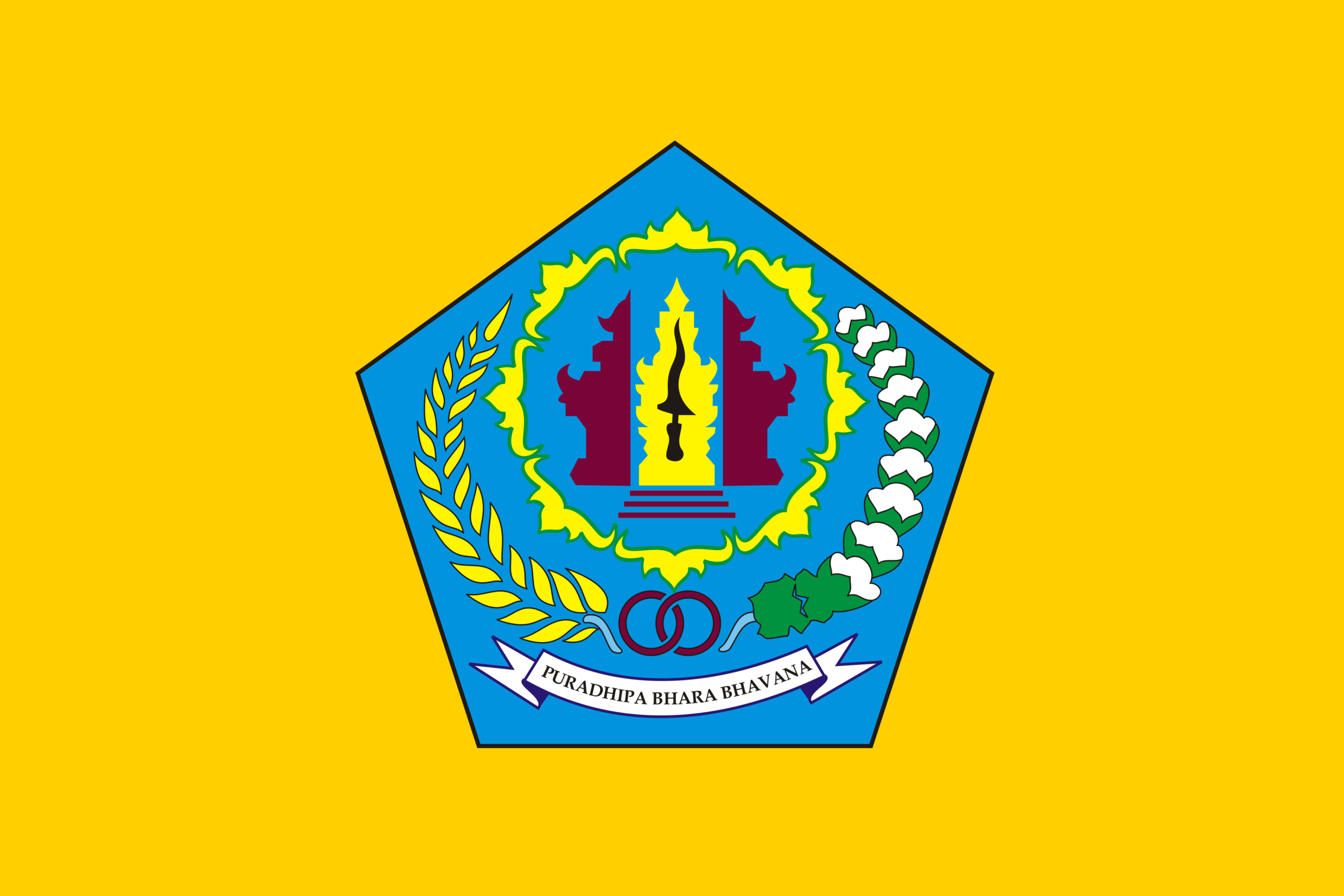
Denpasar

Depok

Dumai

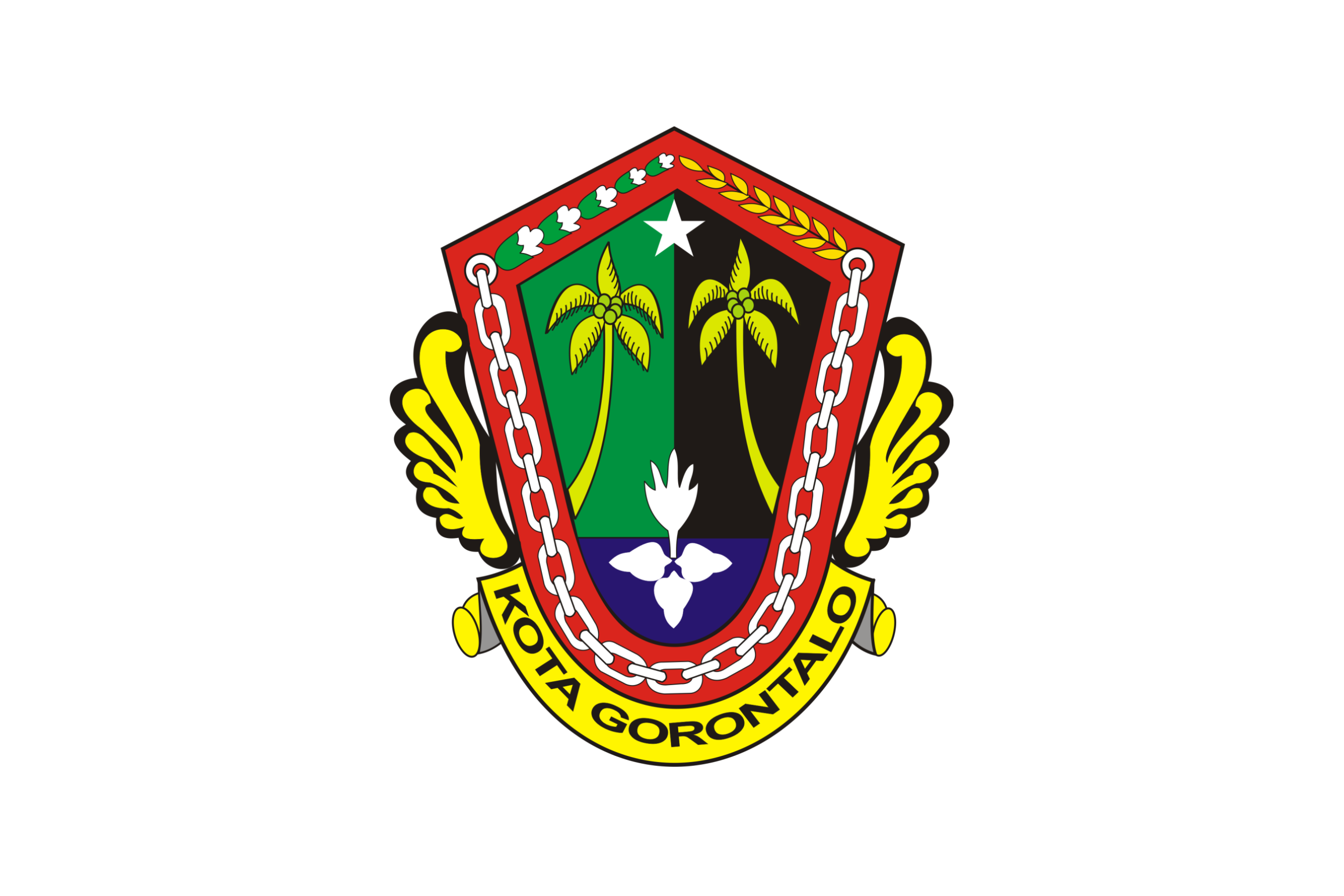
Gorontalo

Jakarta

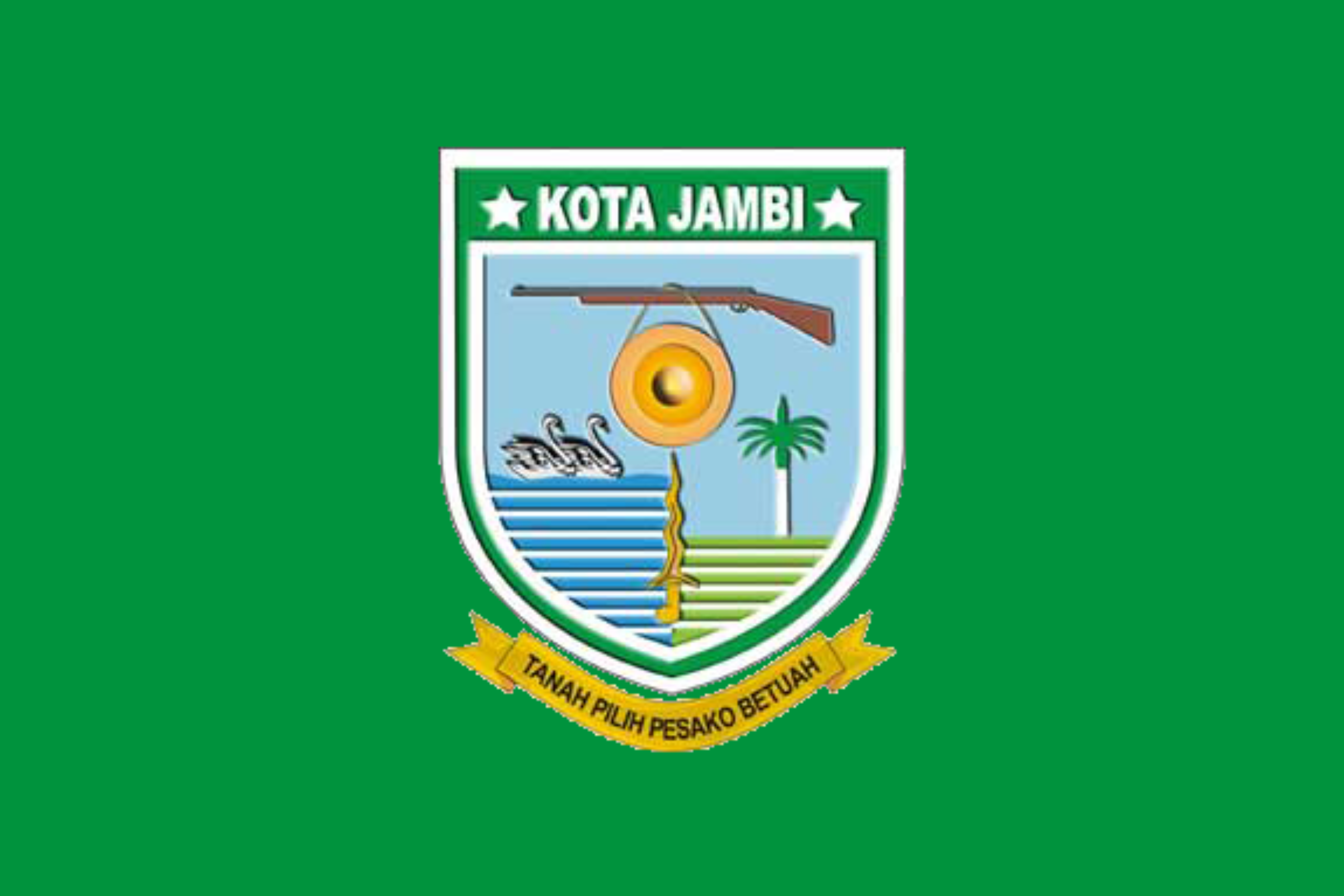
Jambi

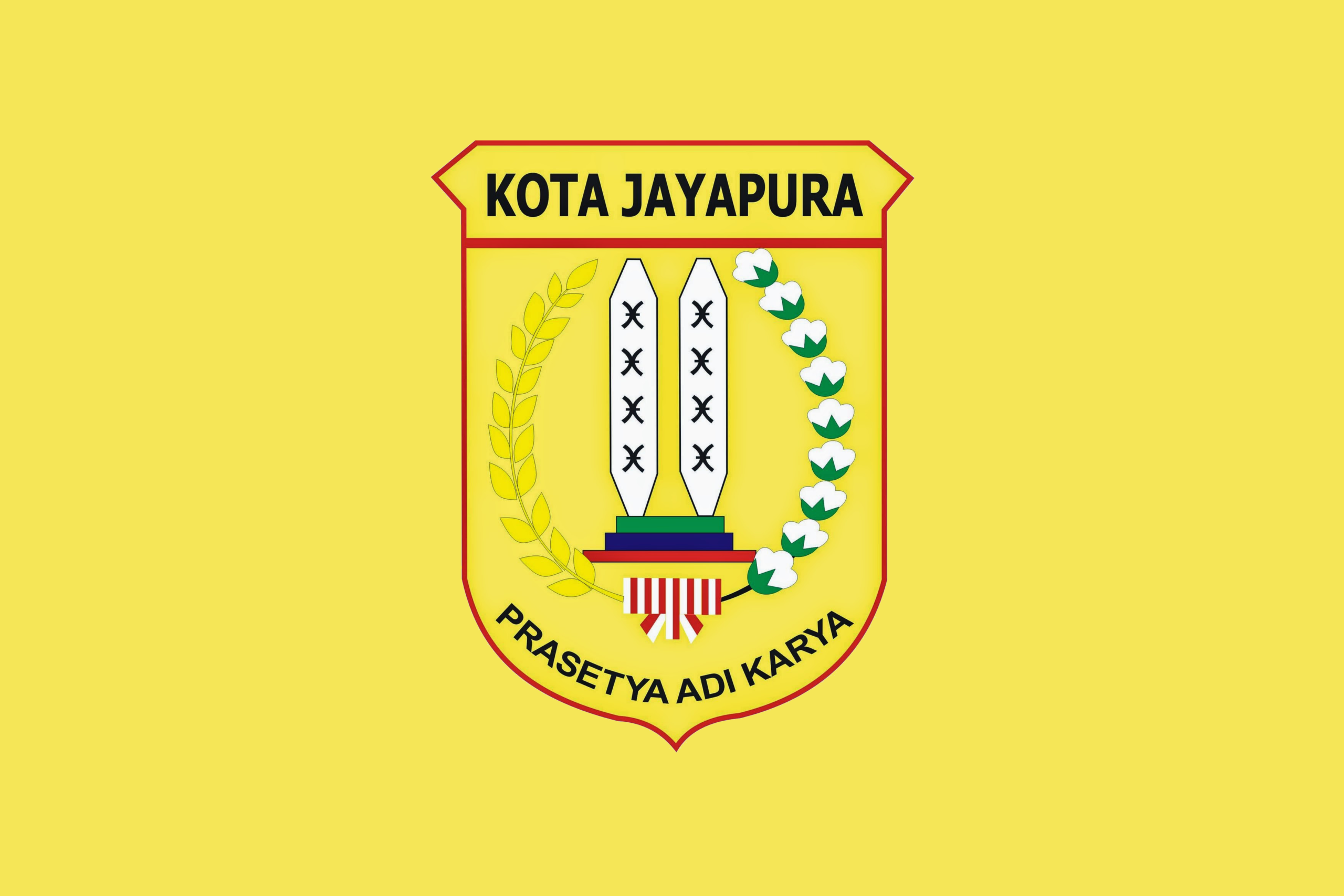
Jayapura

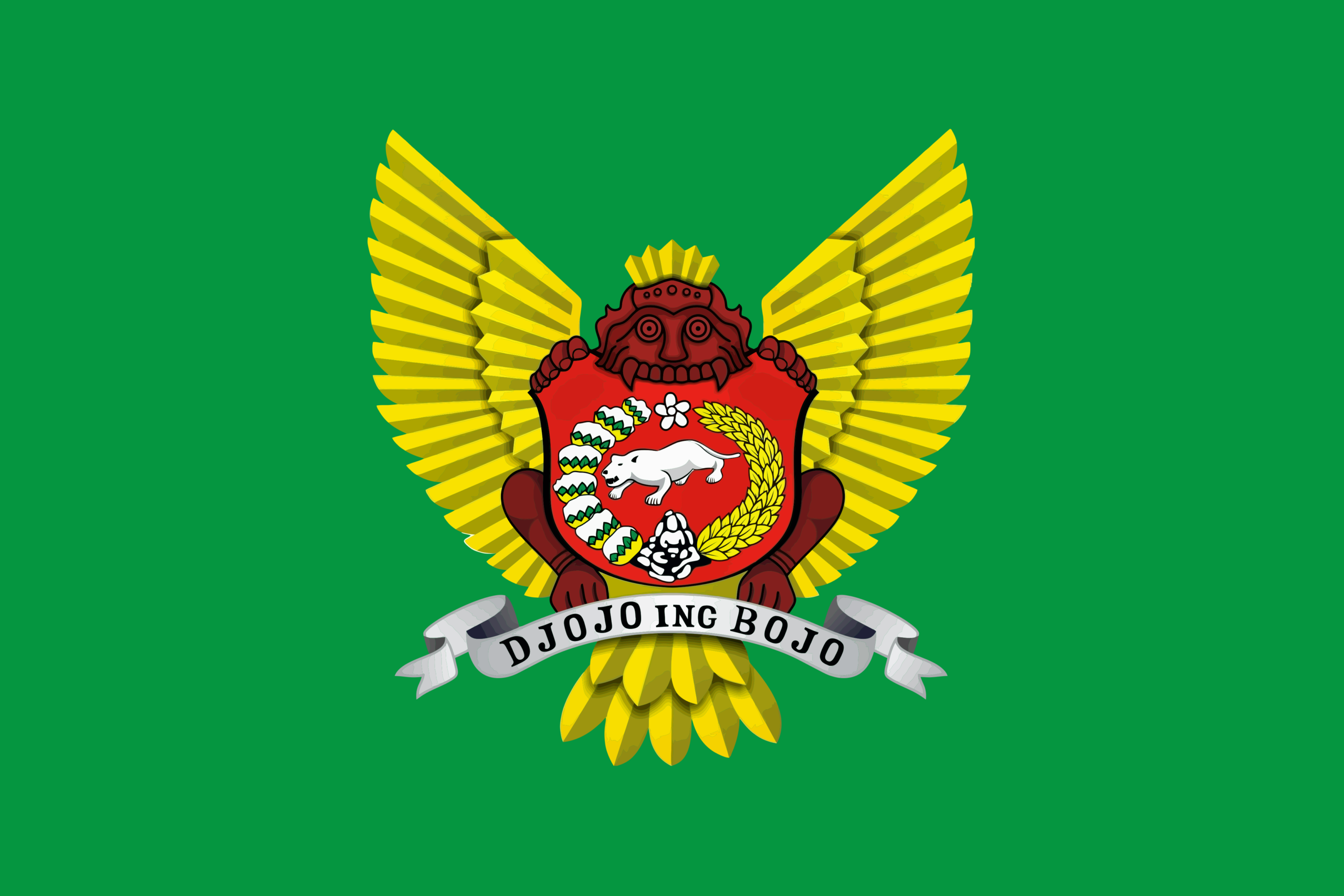
Kediri

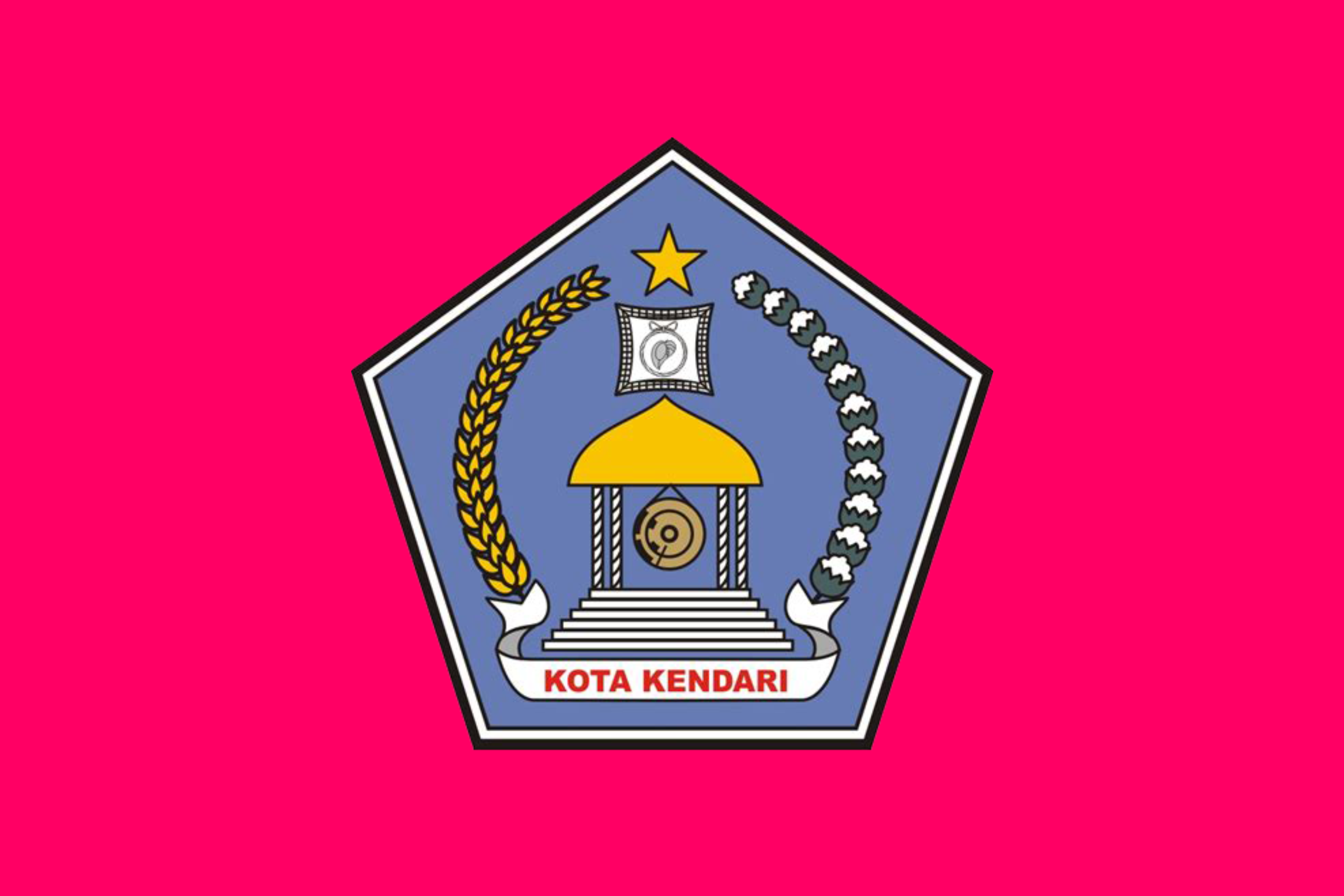
Kendari

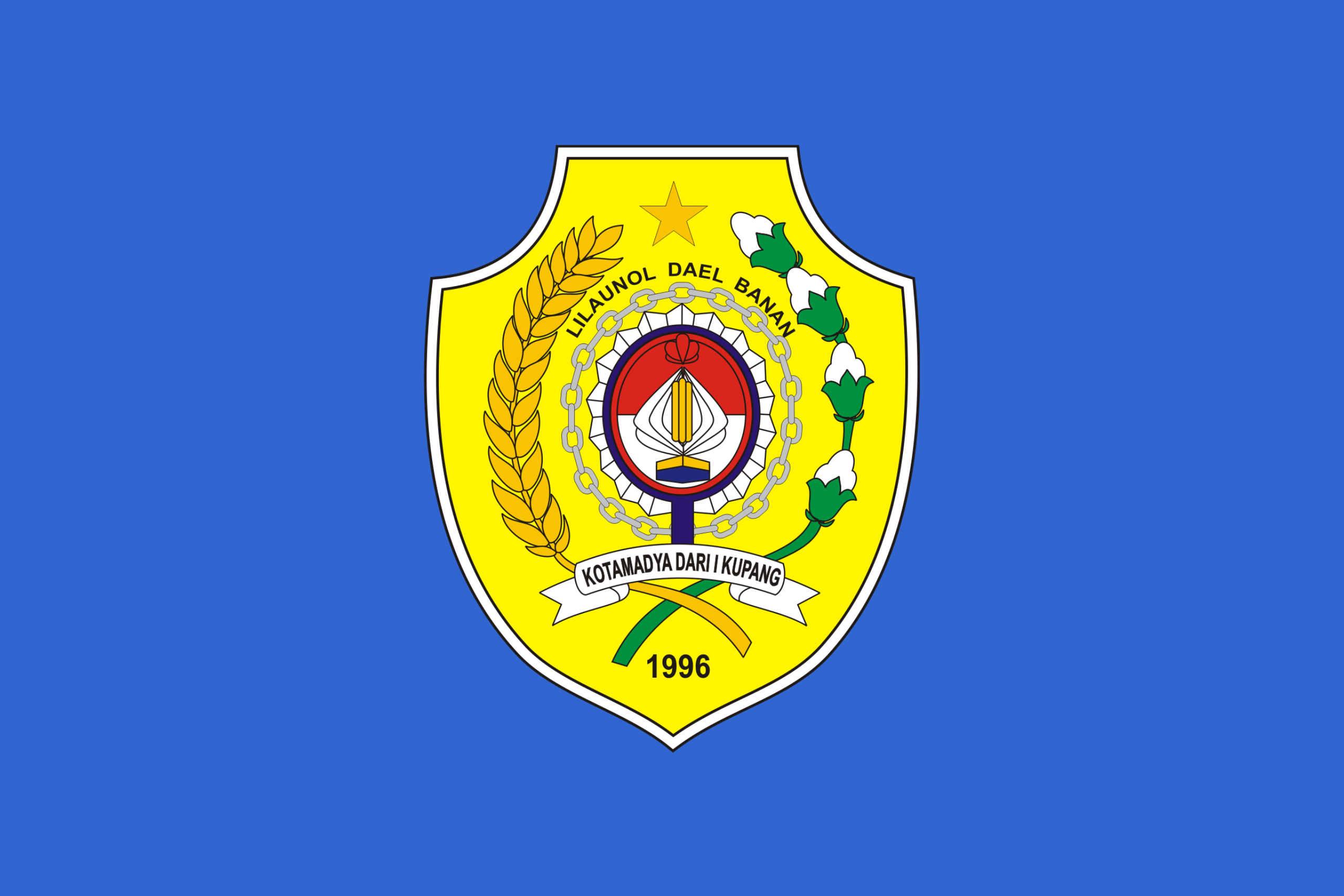
Kupang

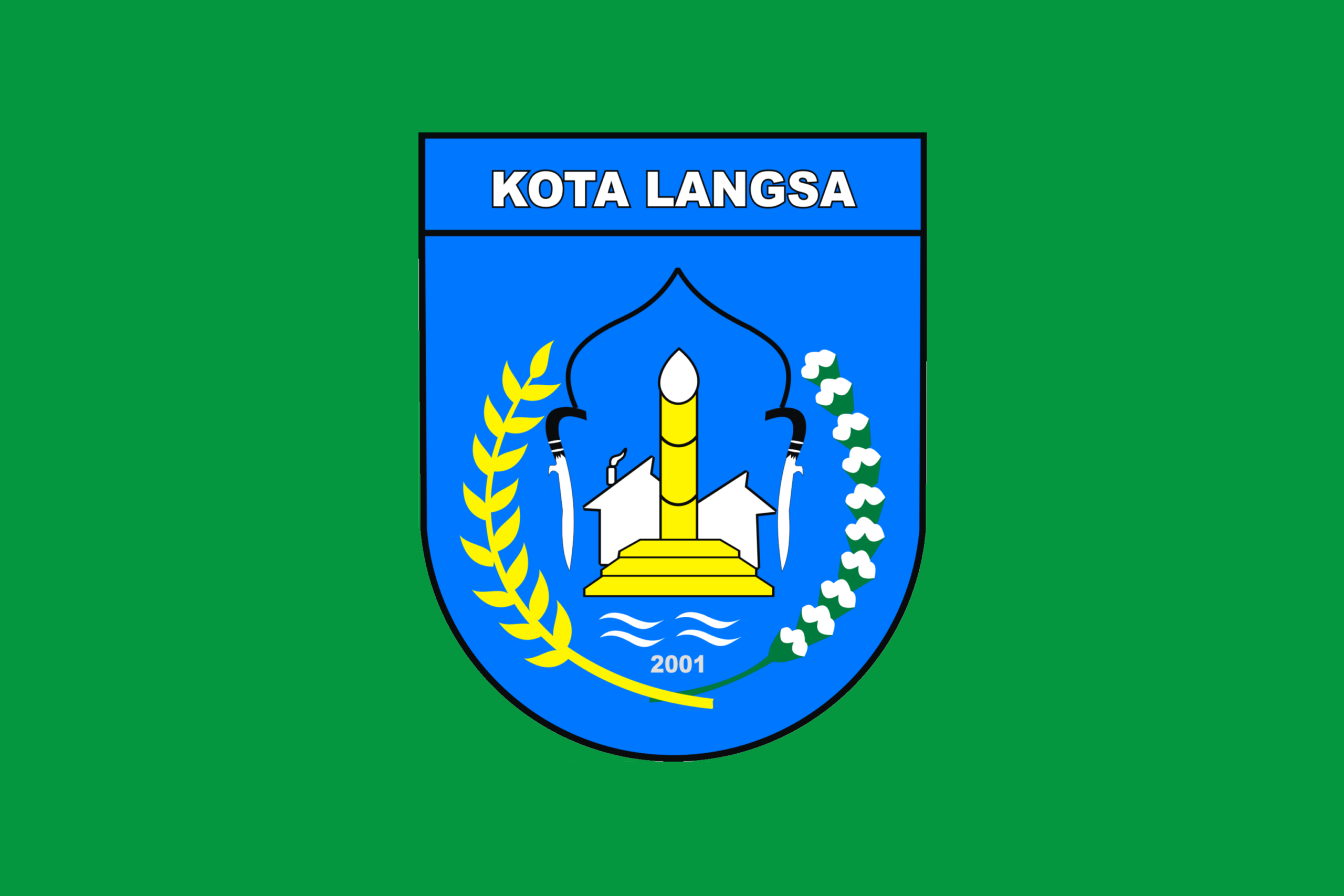
Langsa

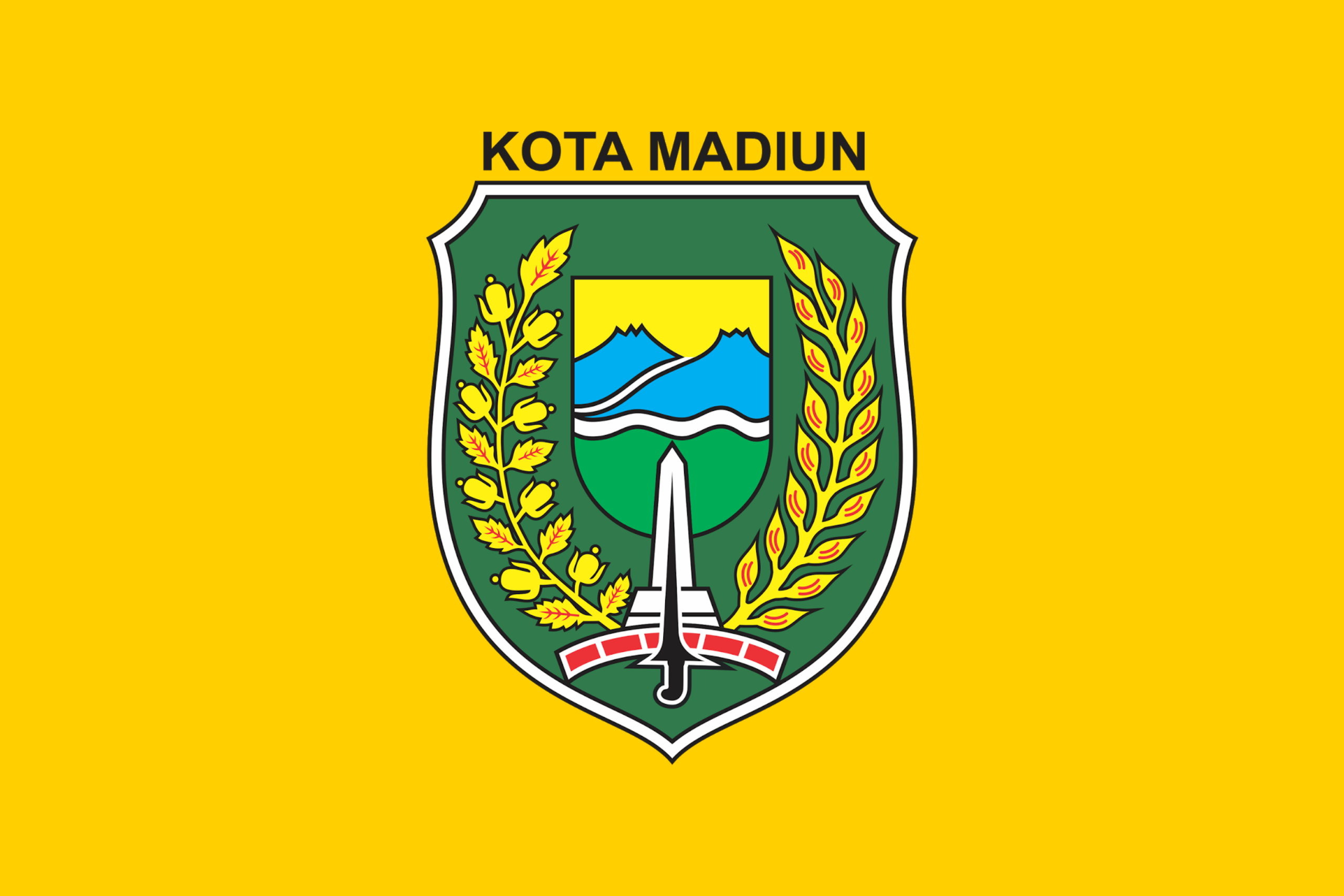
Madiun

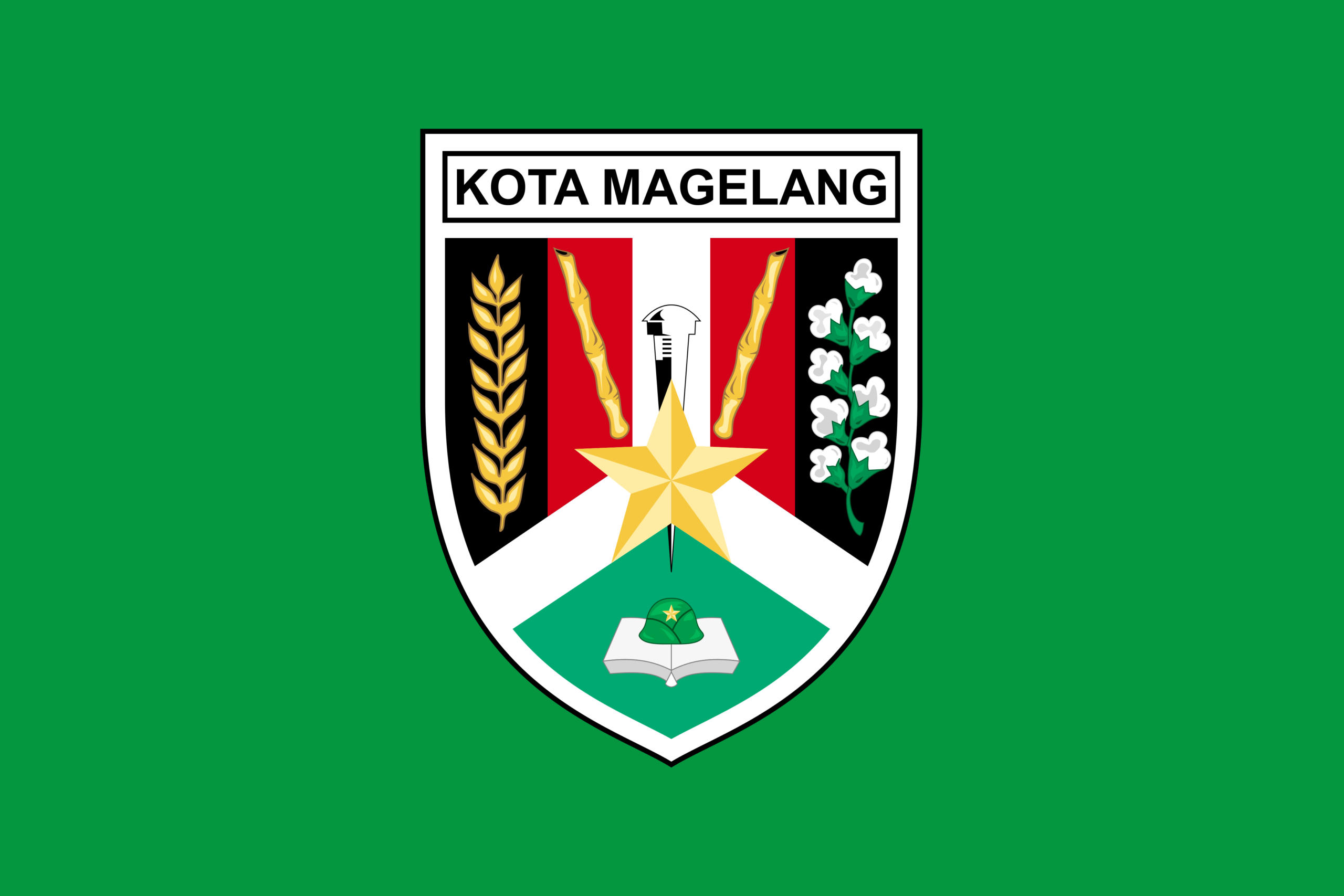
Magelang

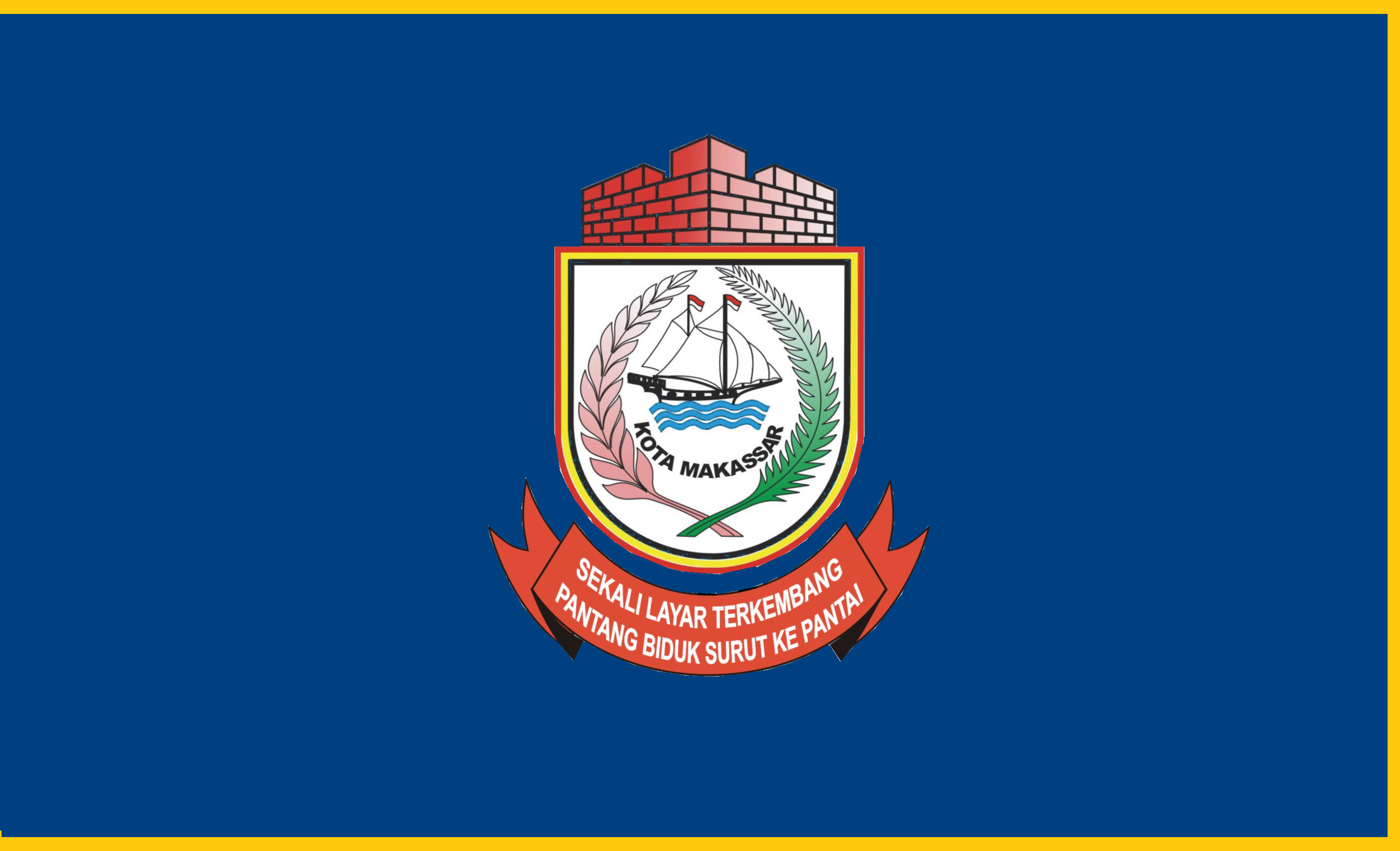
Makassar

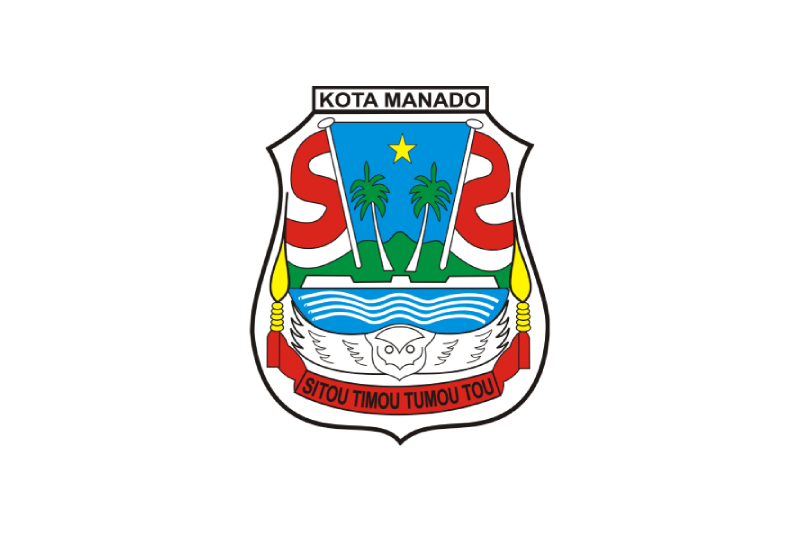
Manado

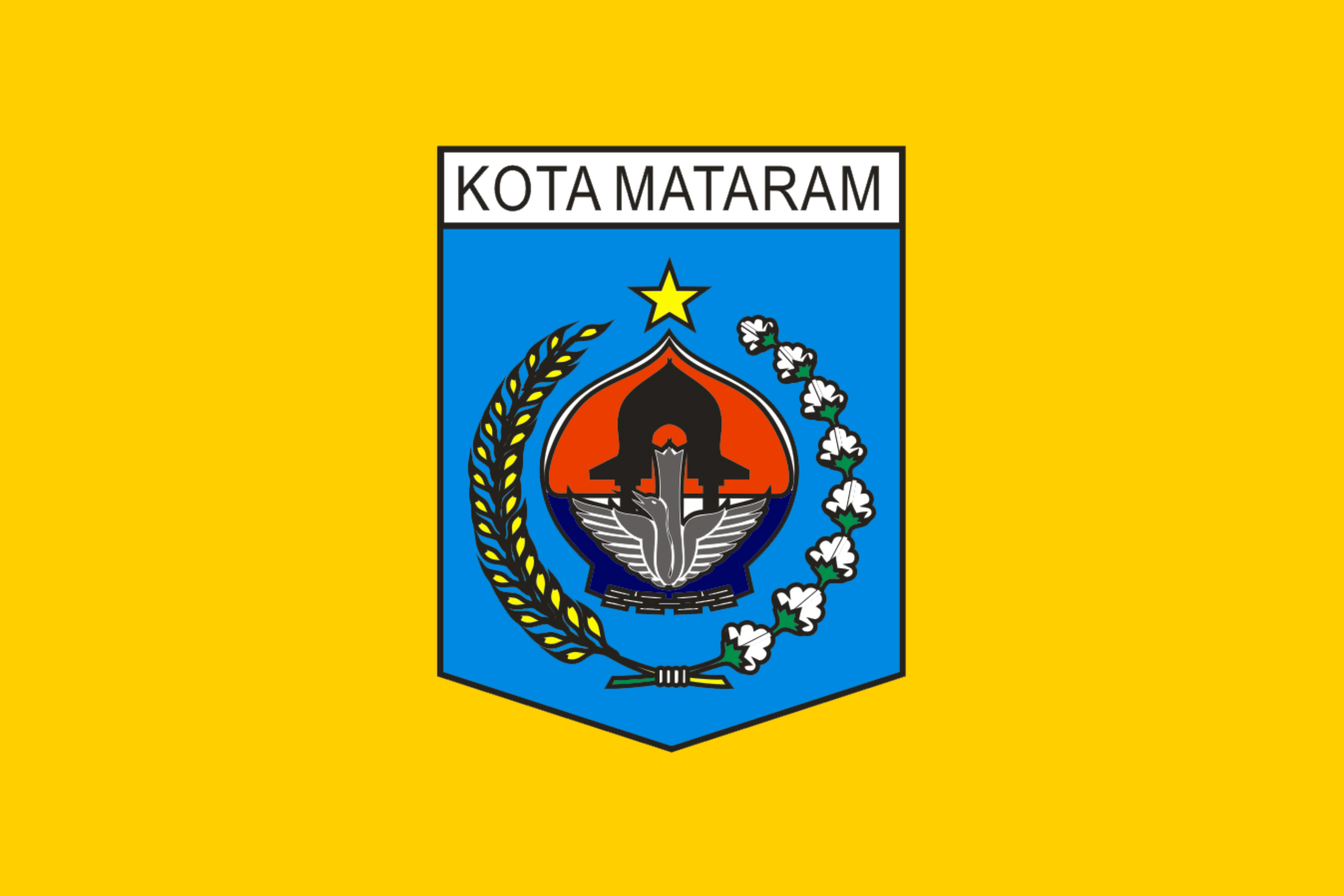
Mataram

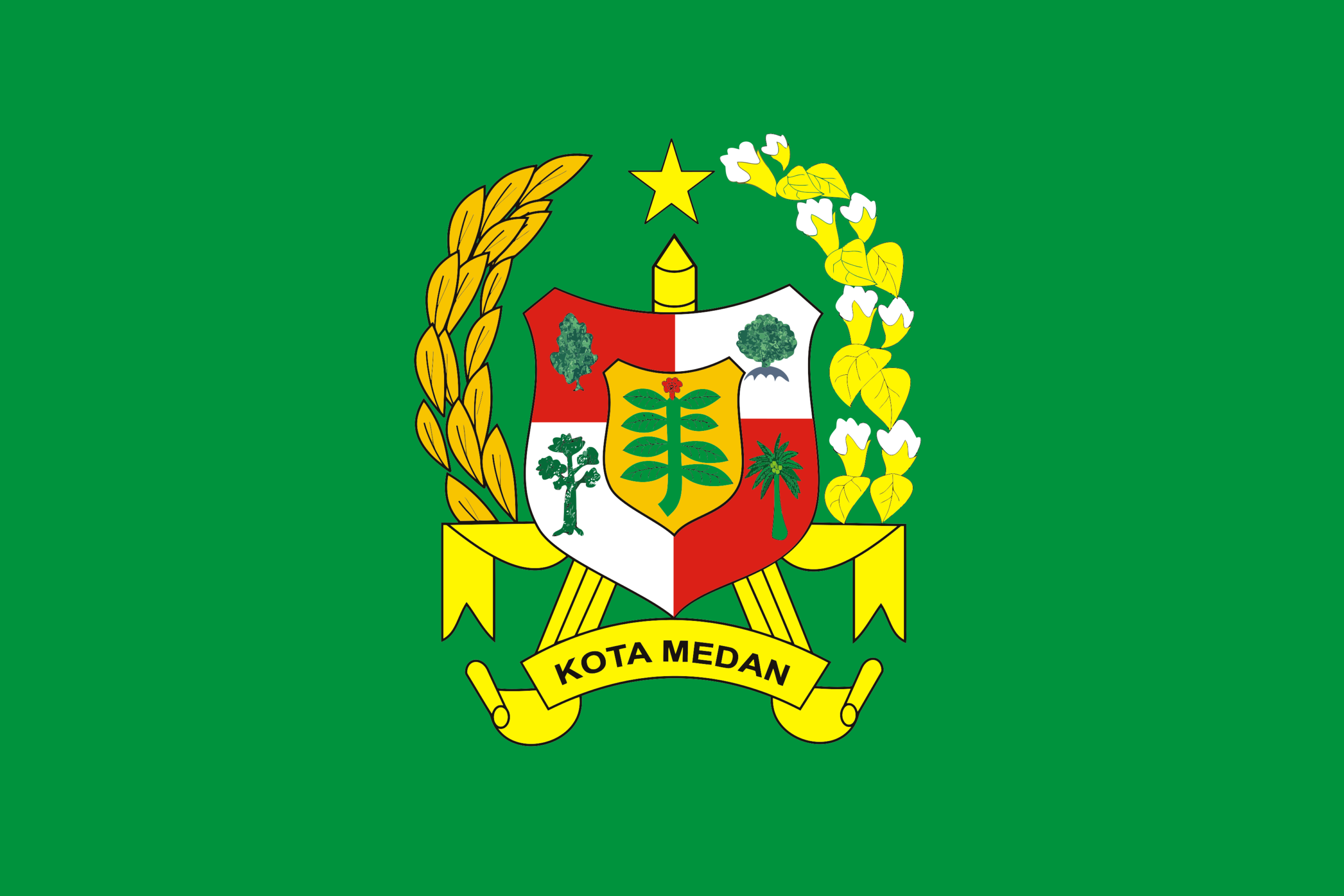
Medan

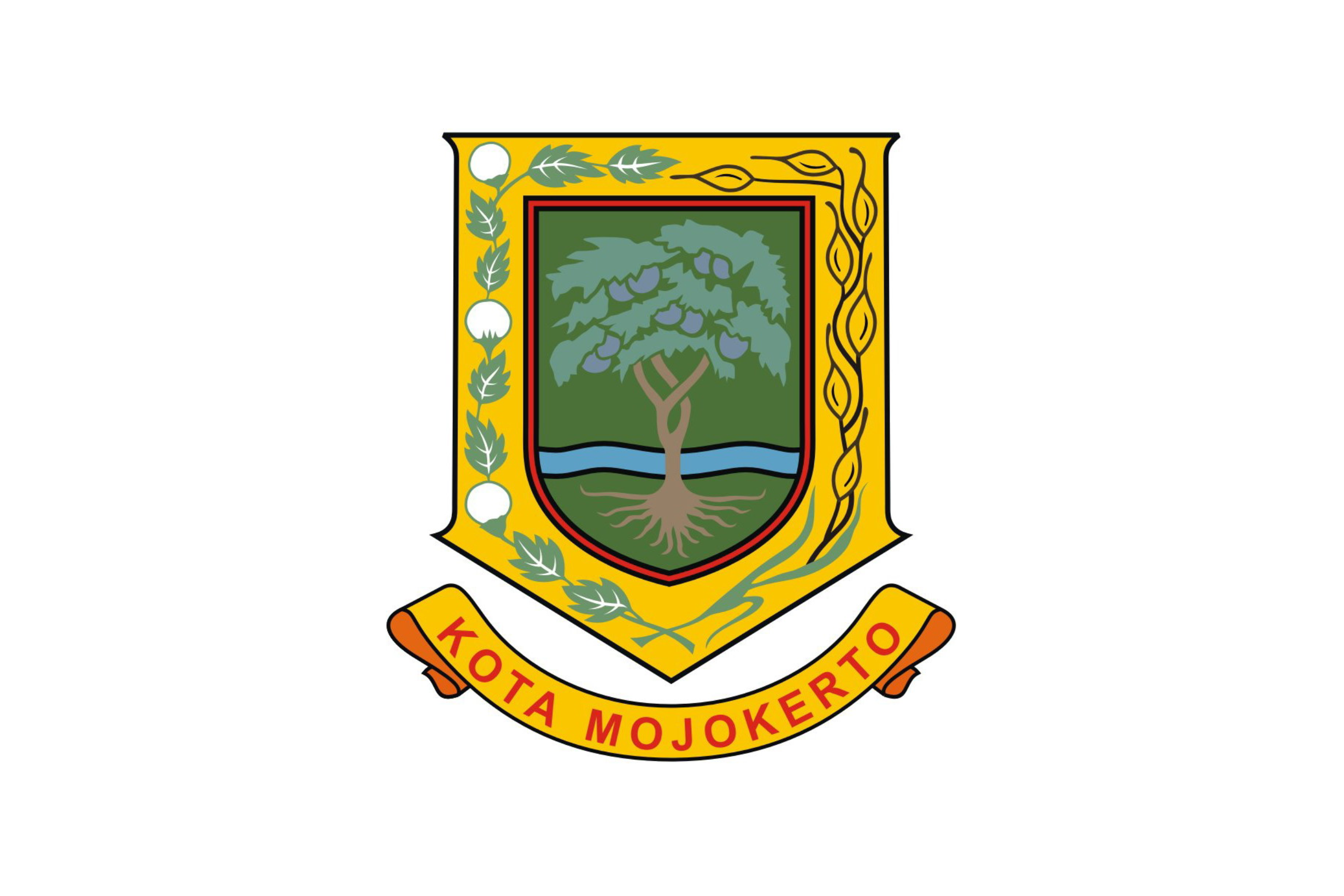
Mojokerto

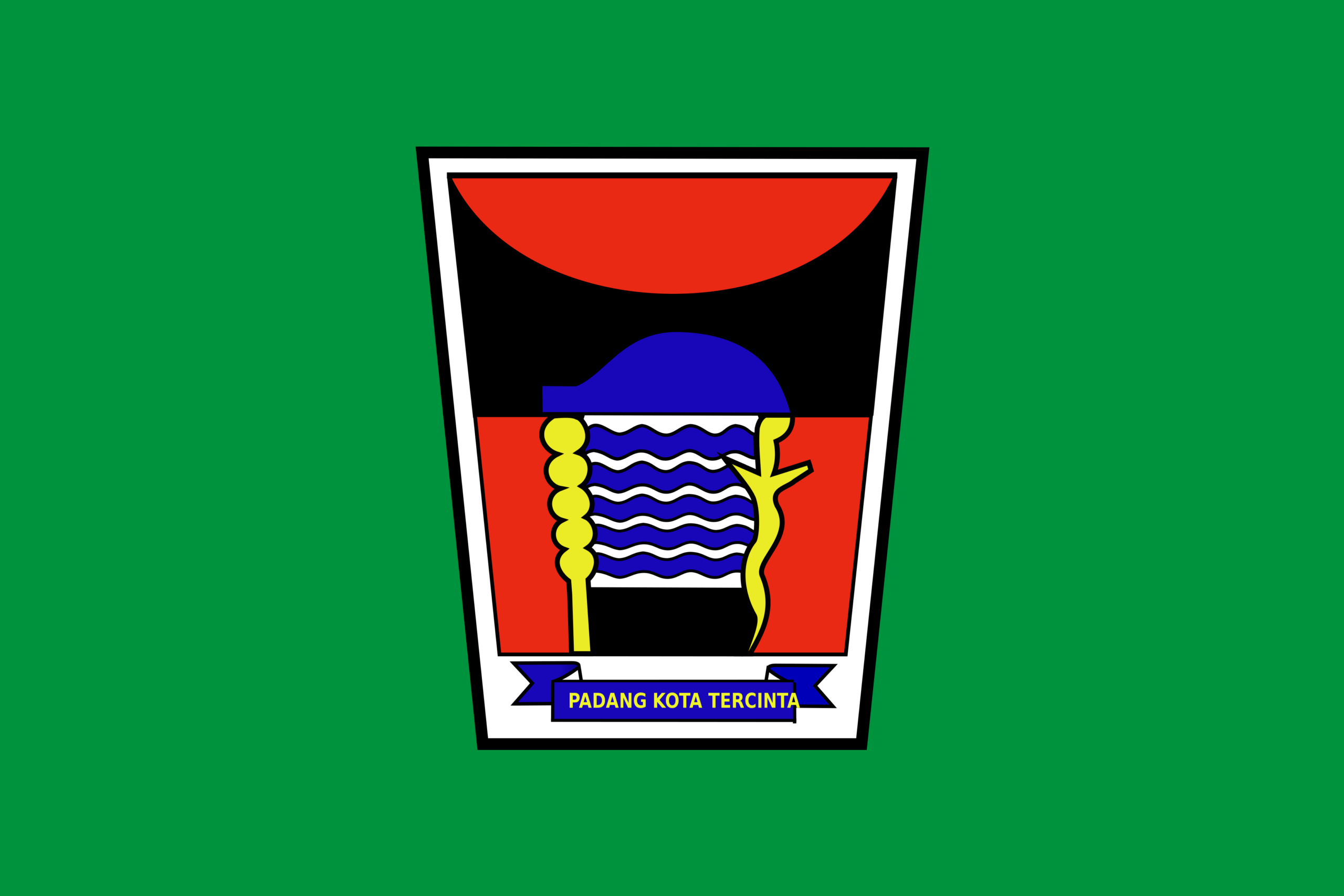
Padang

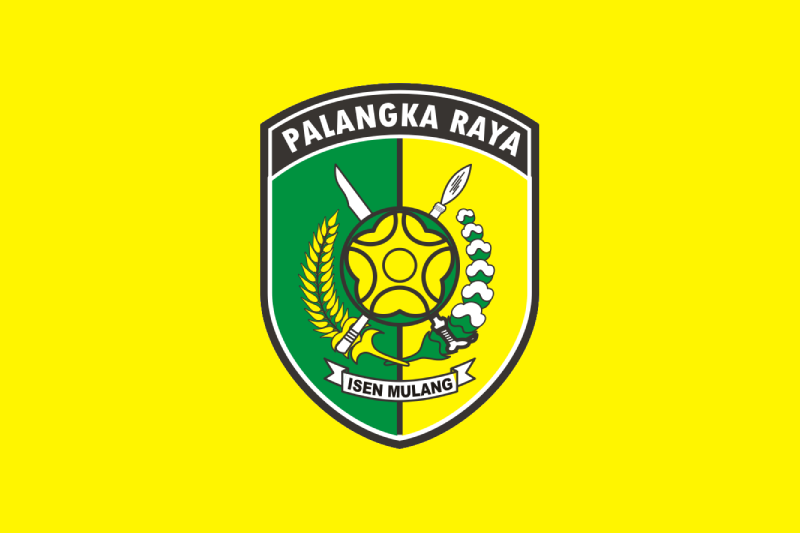
Palangka Raya

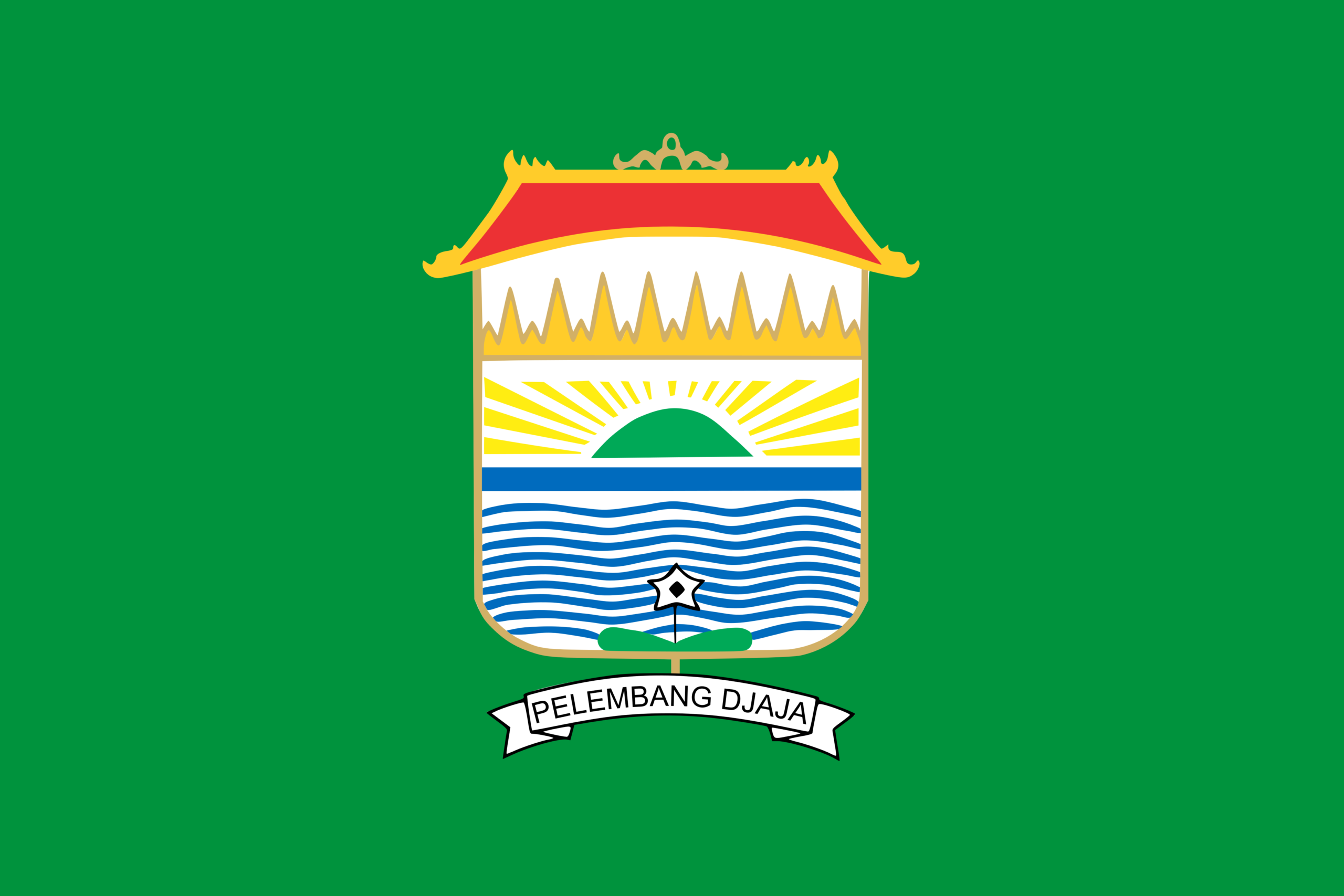
Palembang

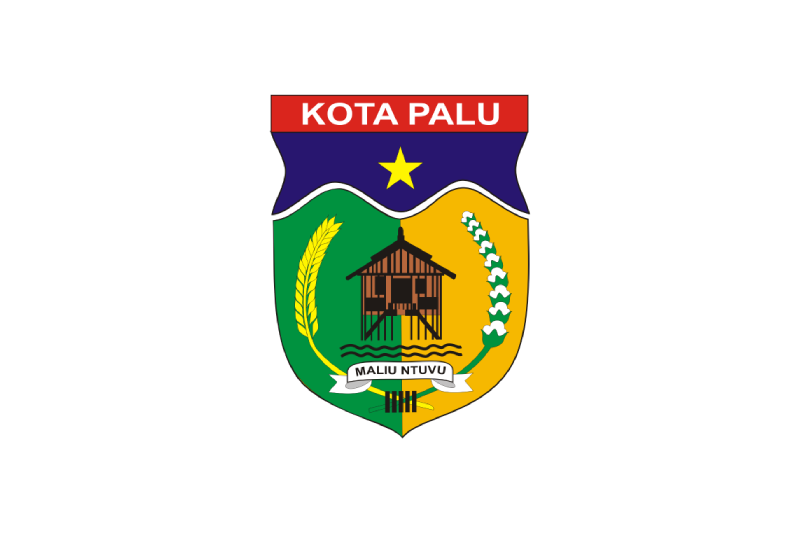
Palu

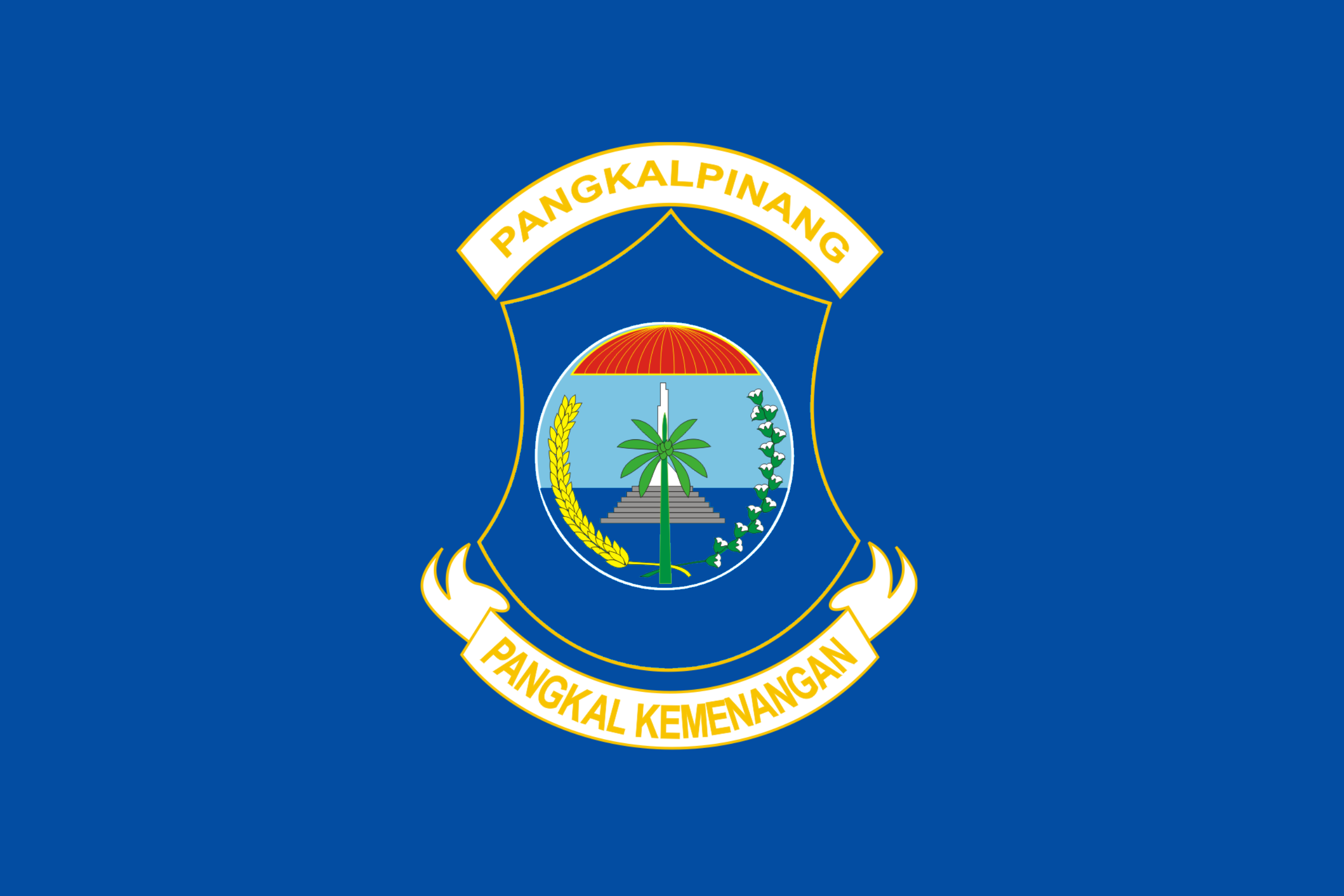
Pangkalpinang

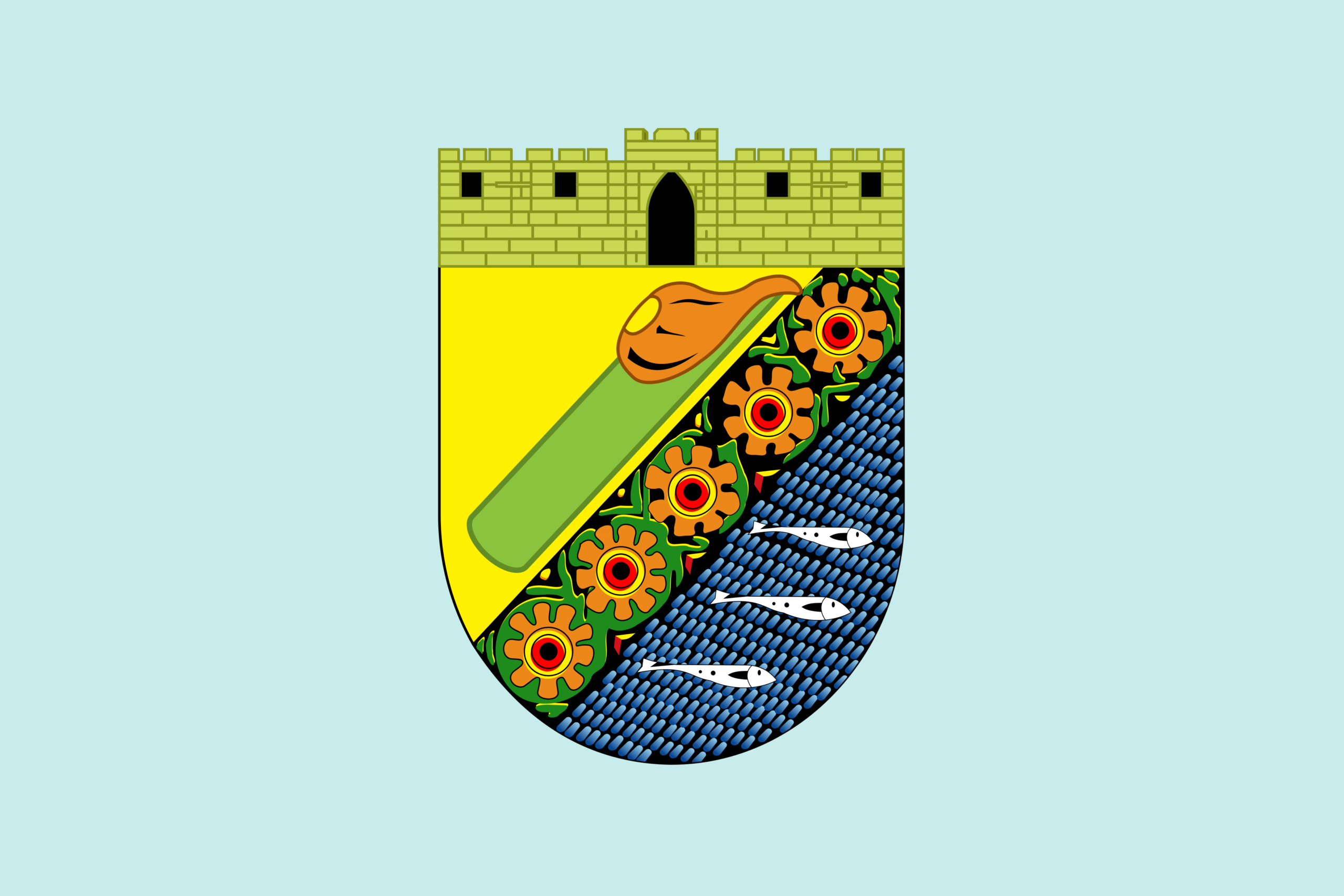
Pekalongan

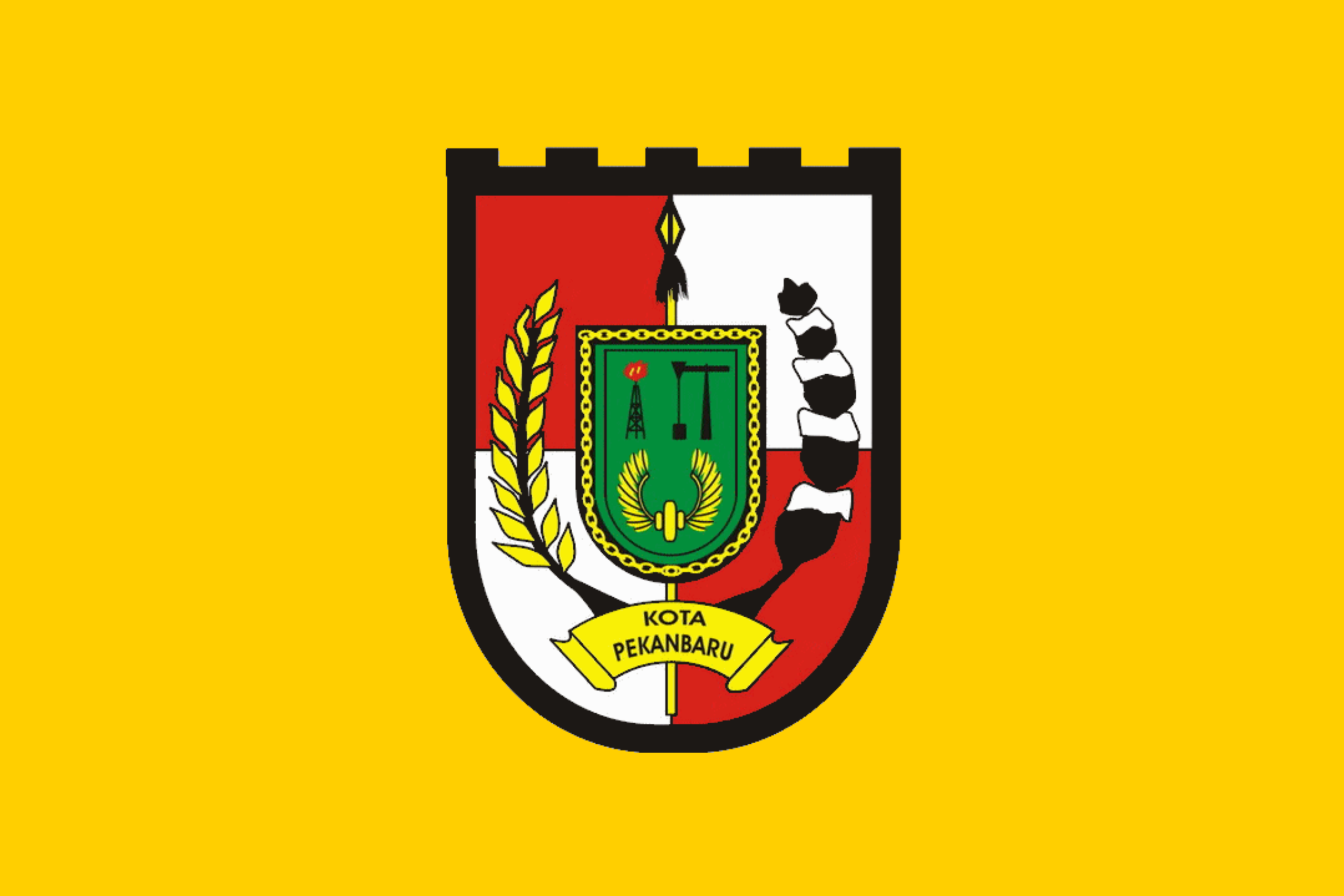
Pekanbaru

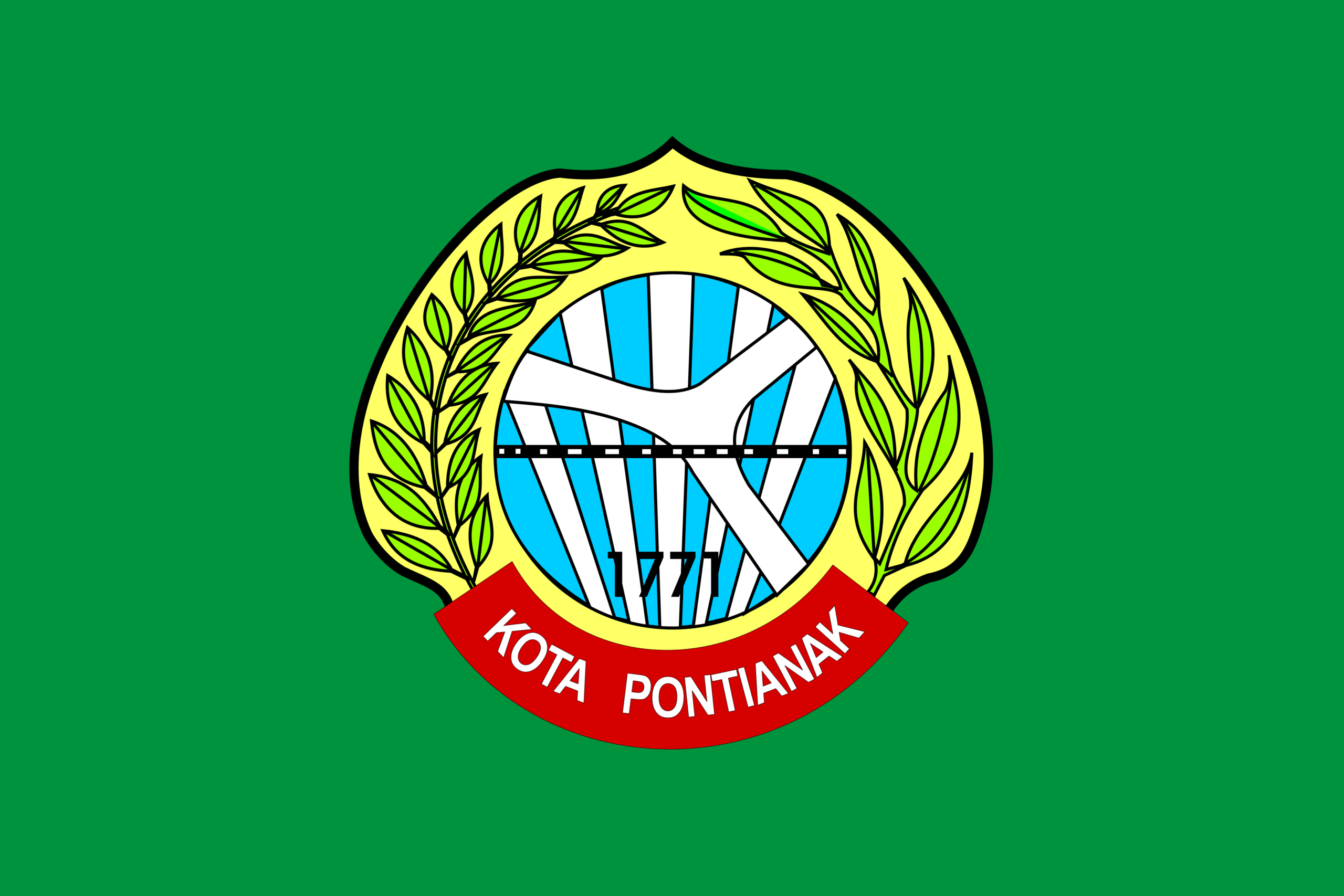
Pontianak

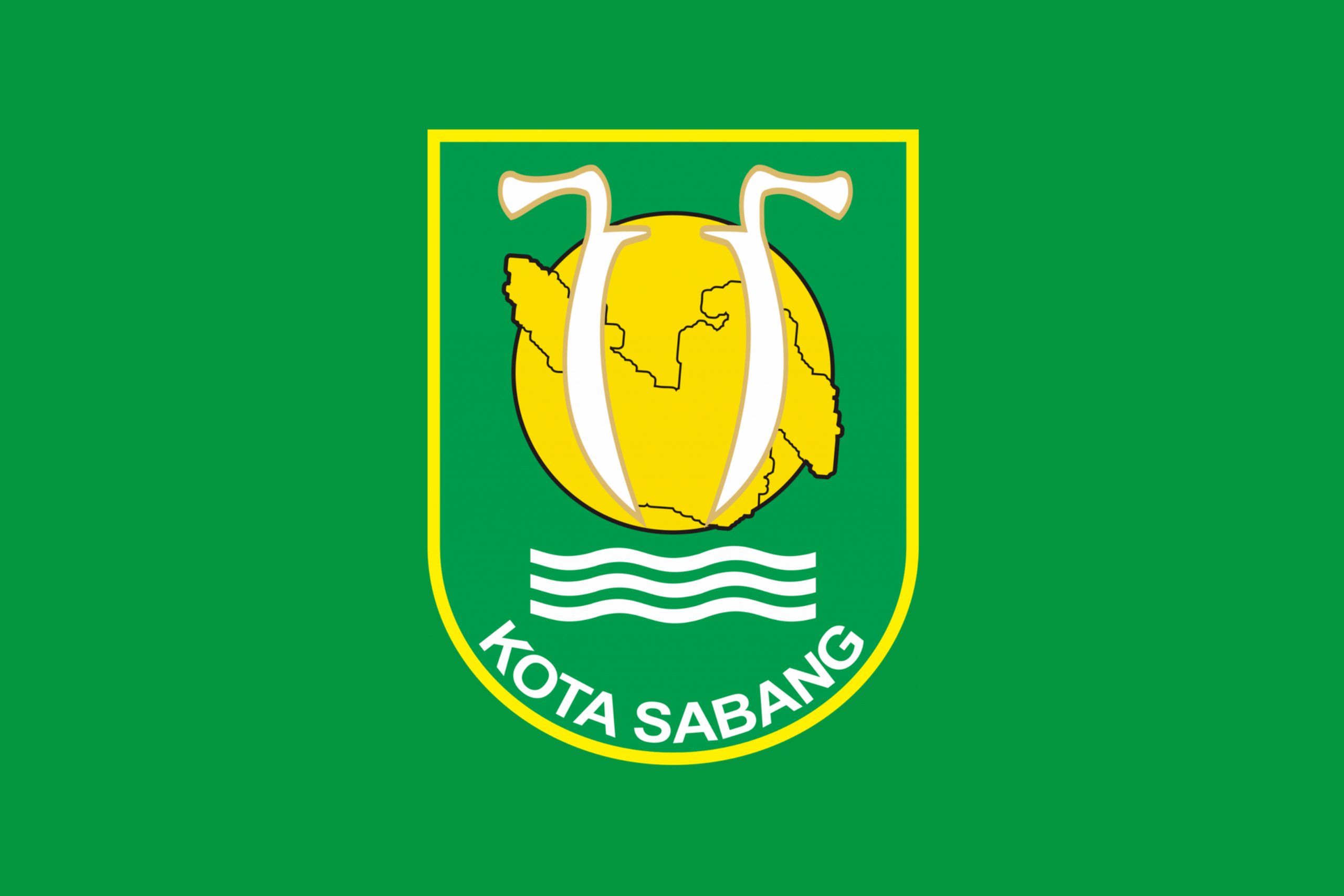
Sabang

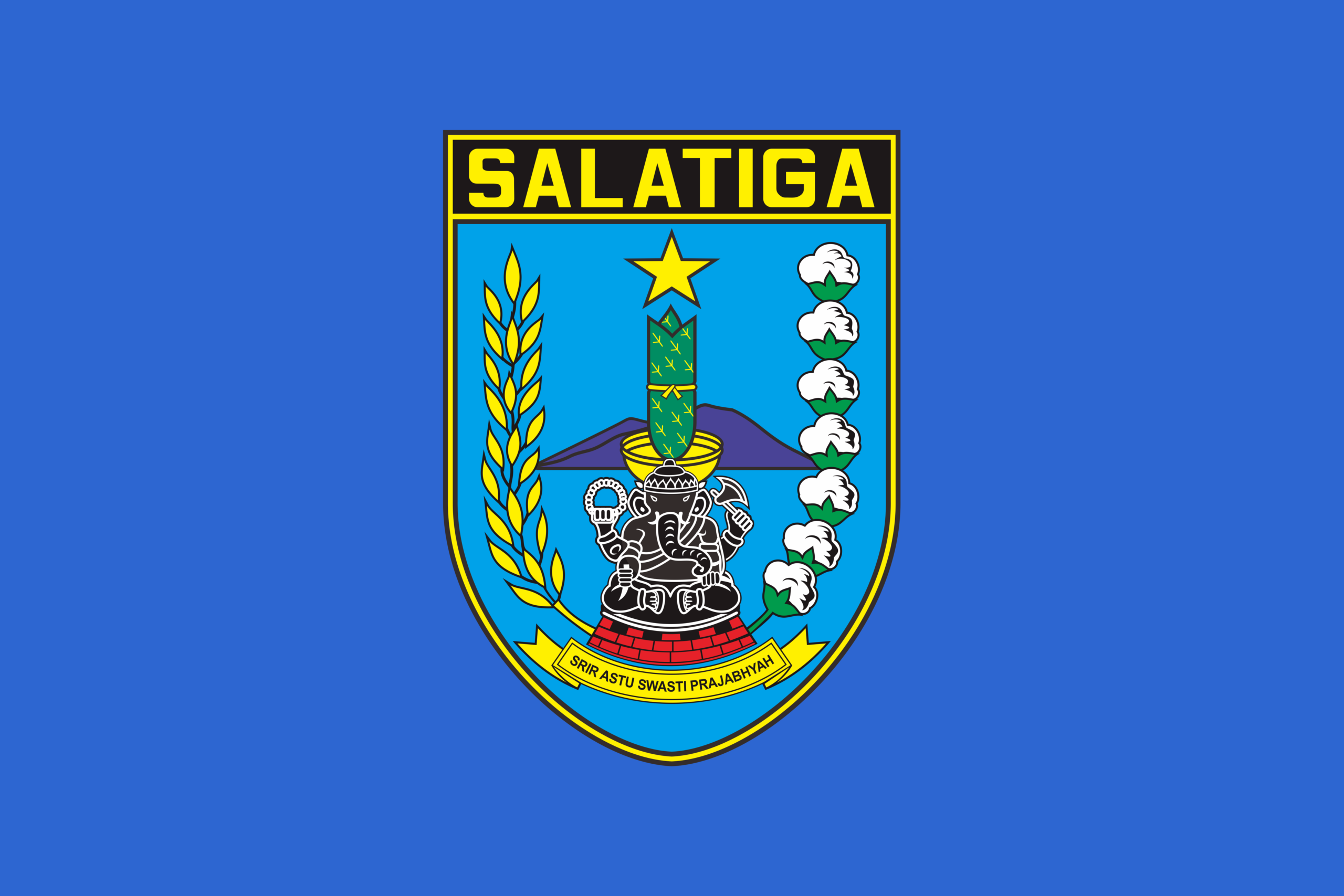
Salatiga

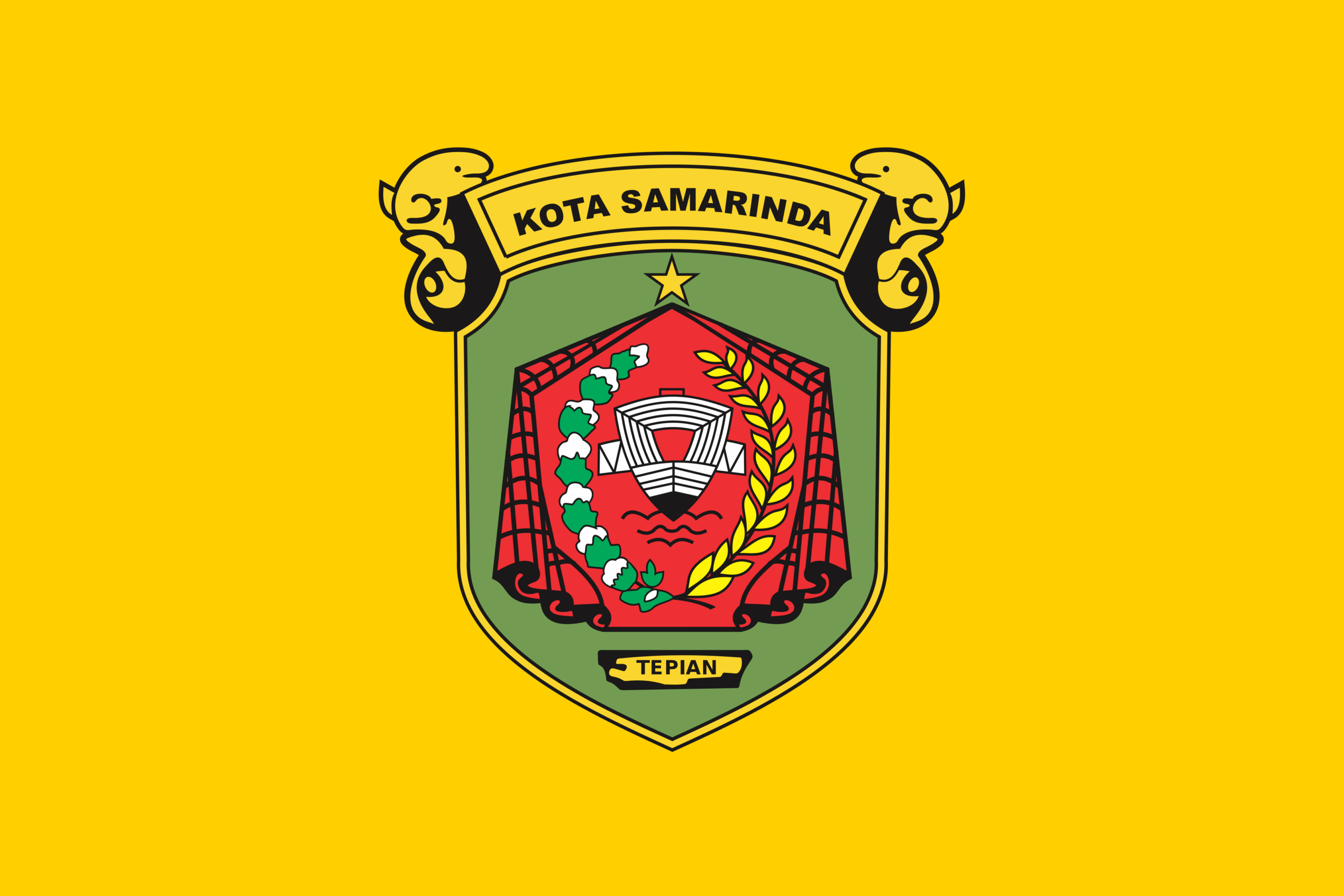
Samarinda

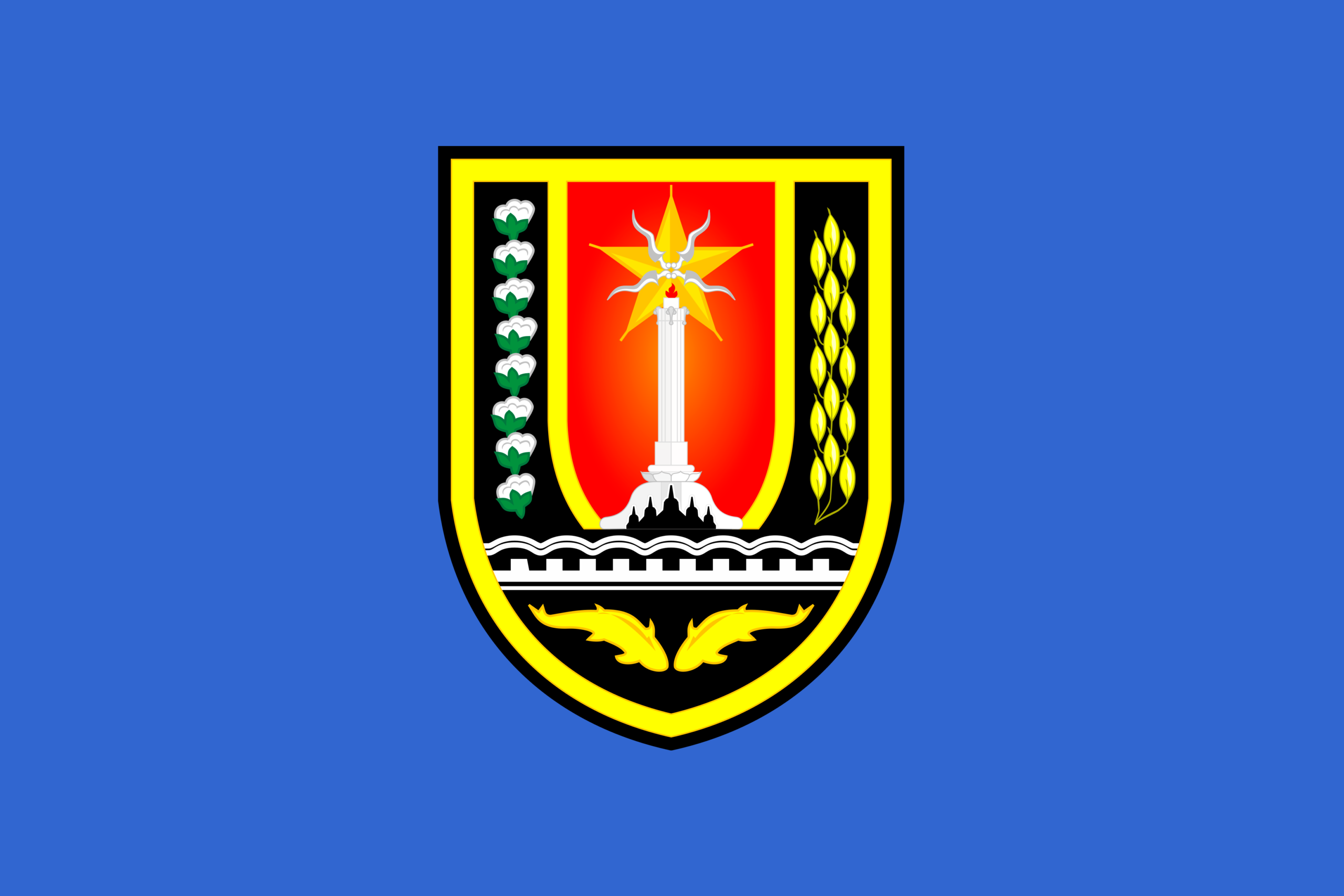
Semarang

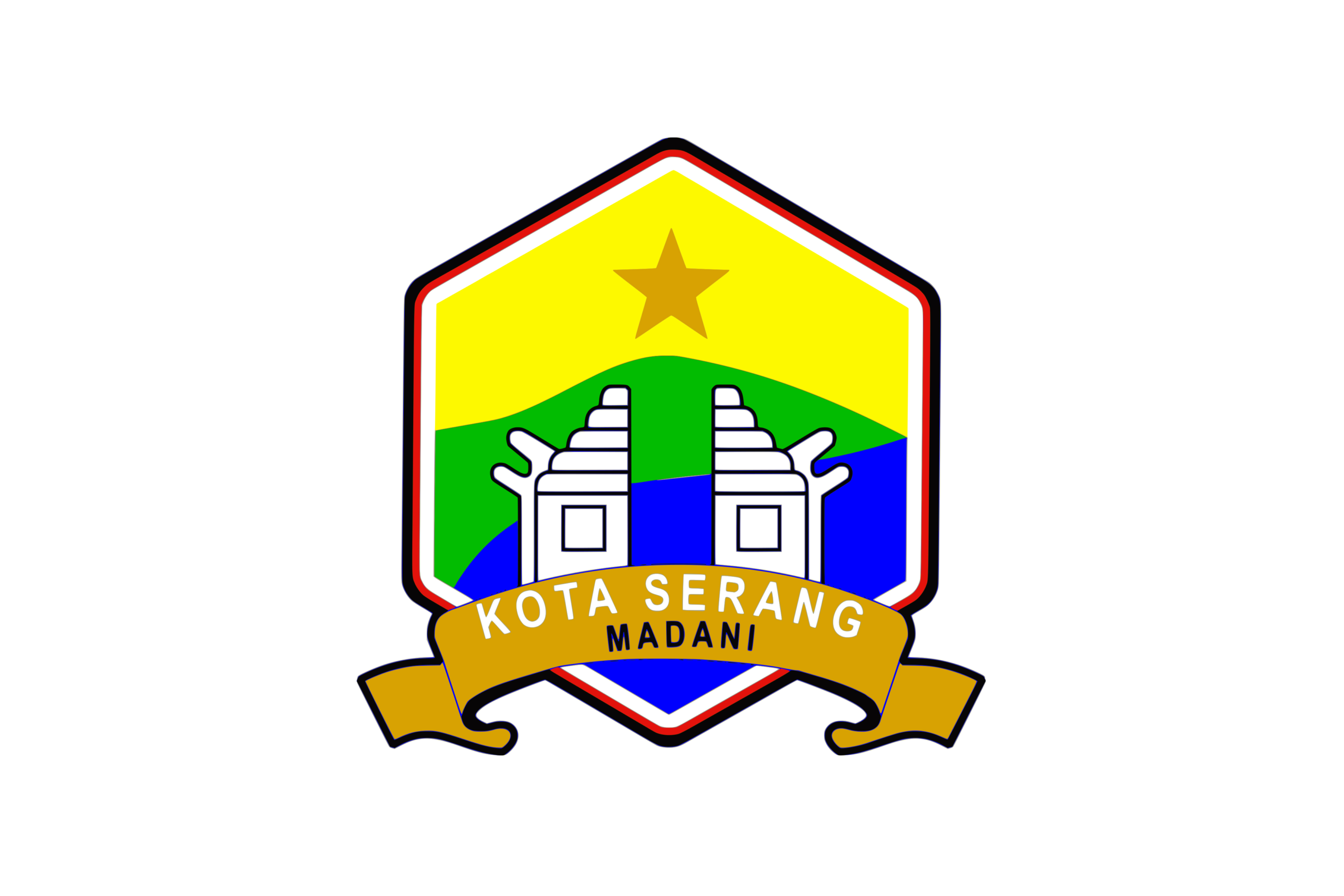
Serang

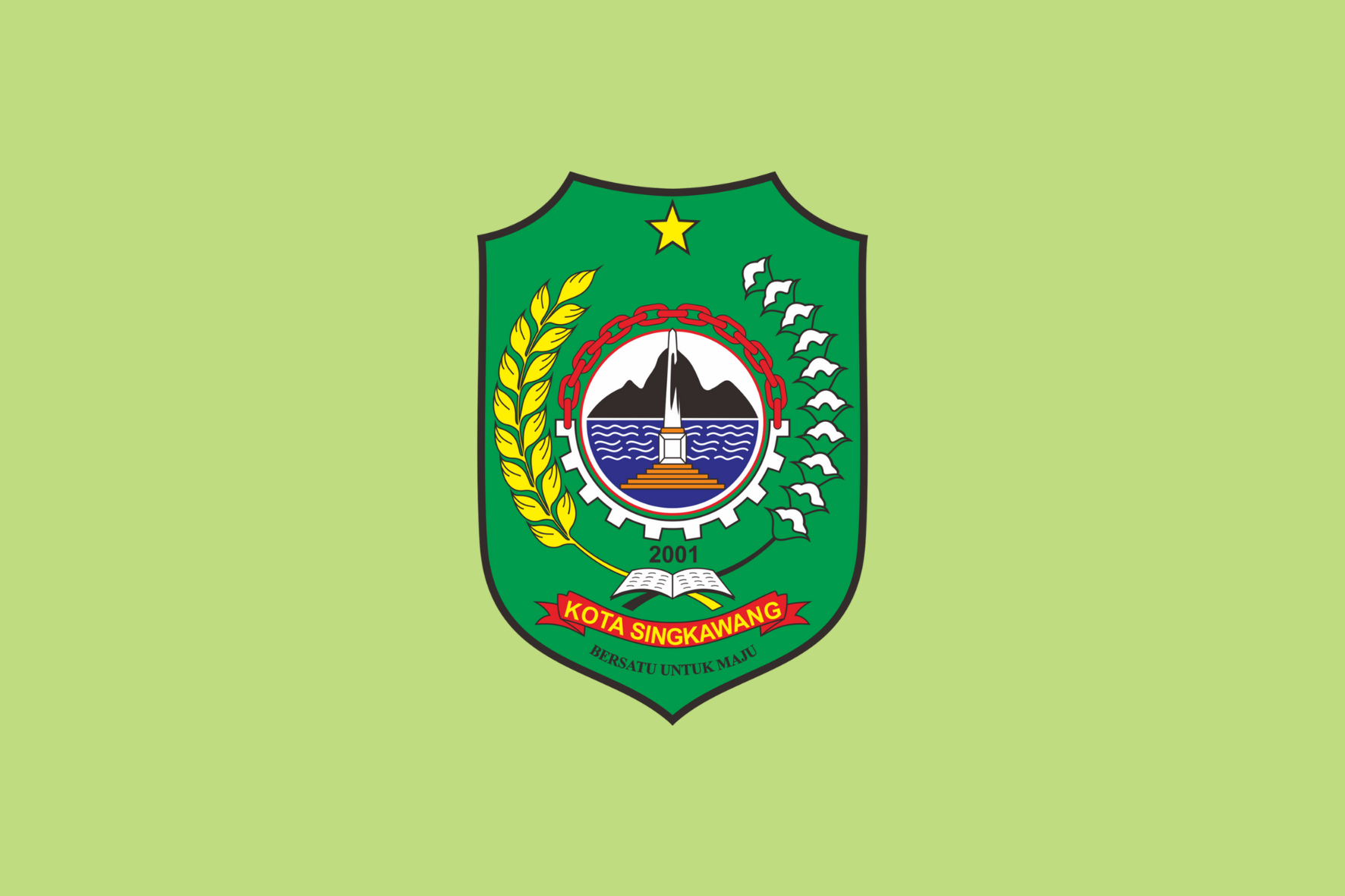
Singkawang

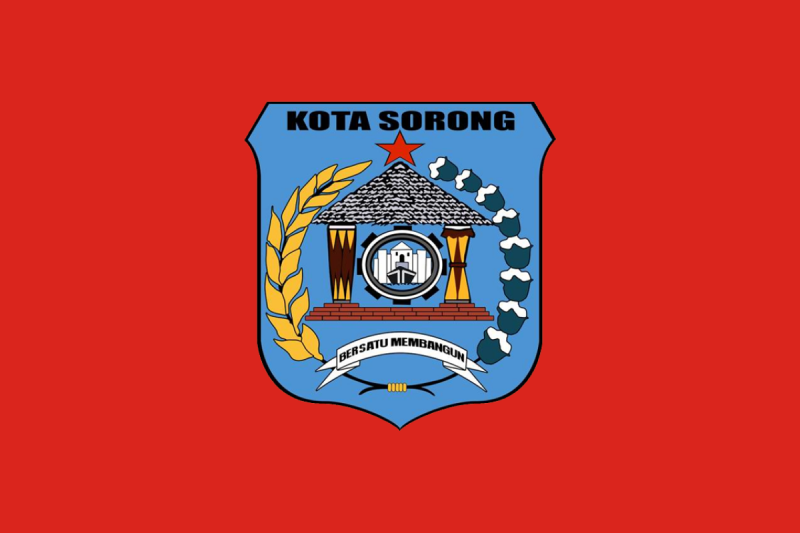
Sorong

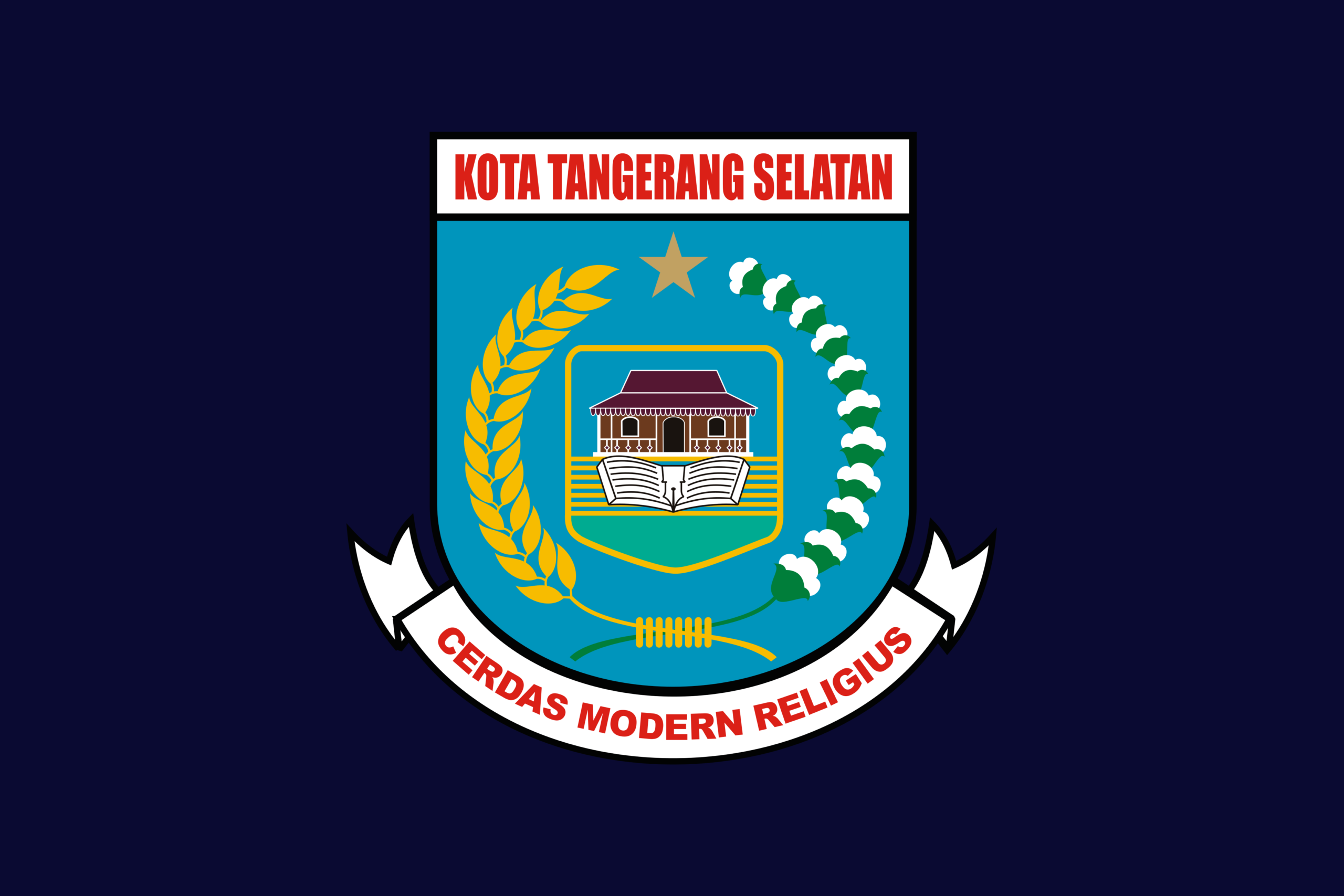
South Tangerang

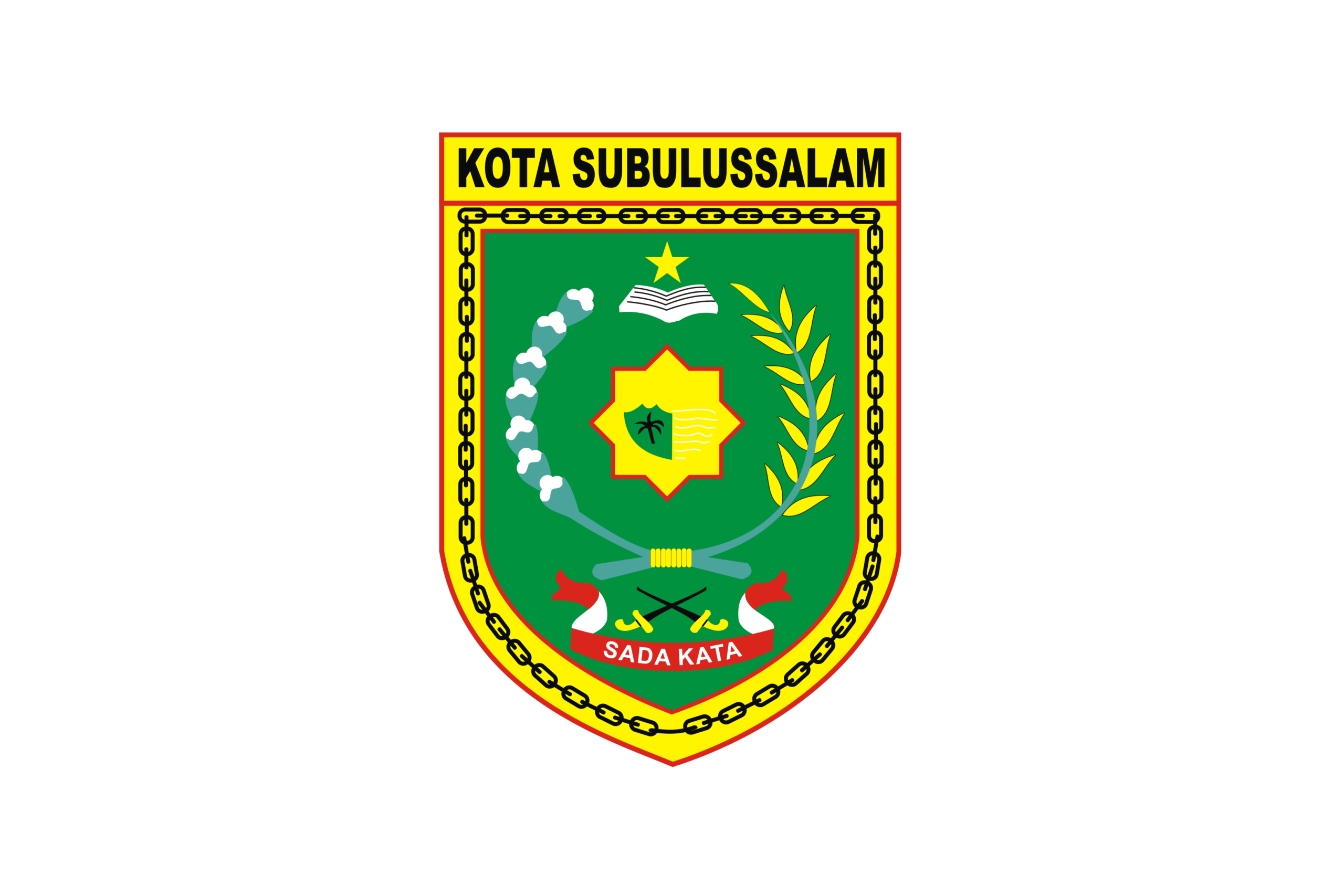
Subulussalam

Sukabumi

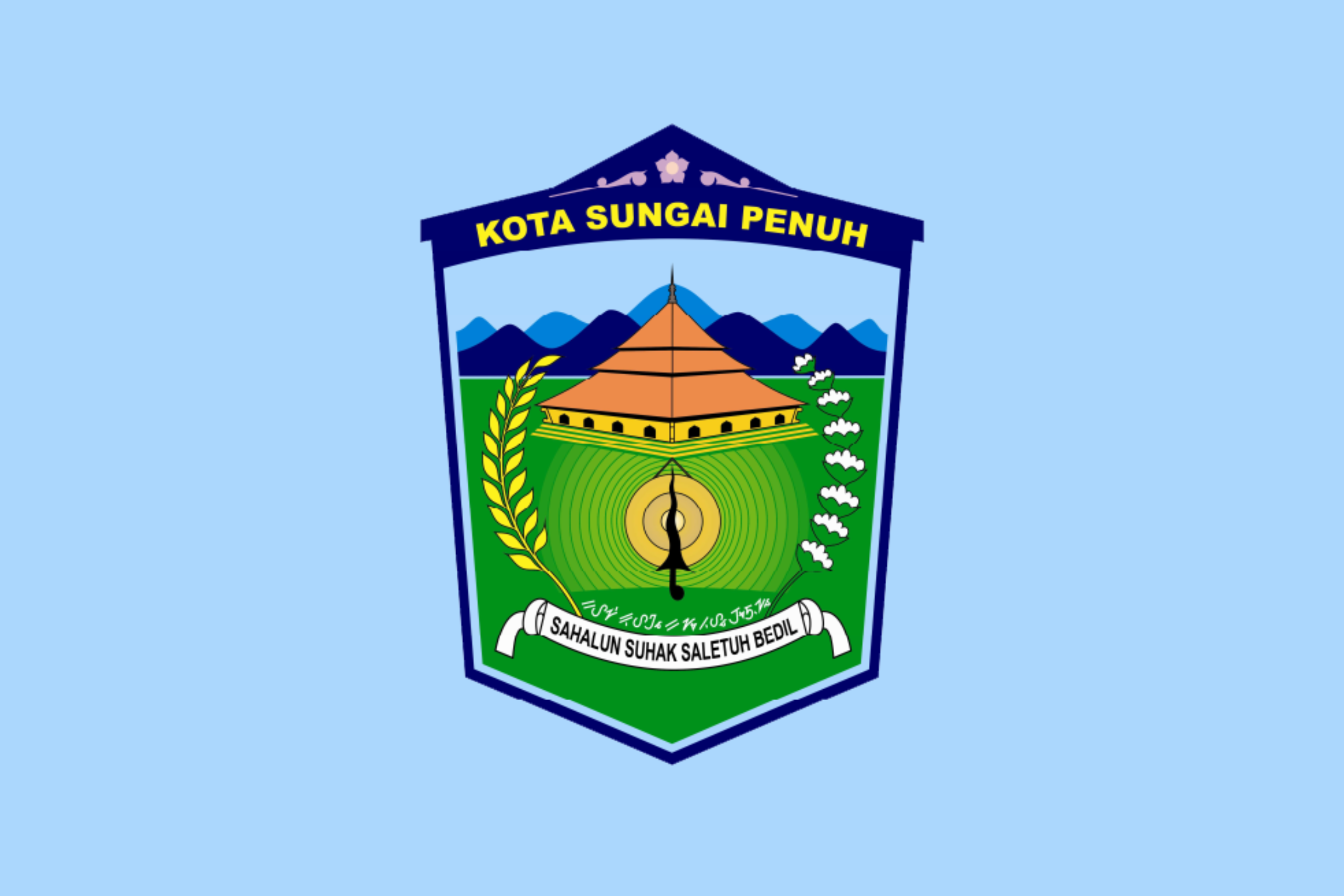
Sungai Penuh

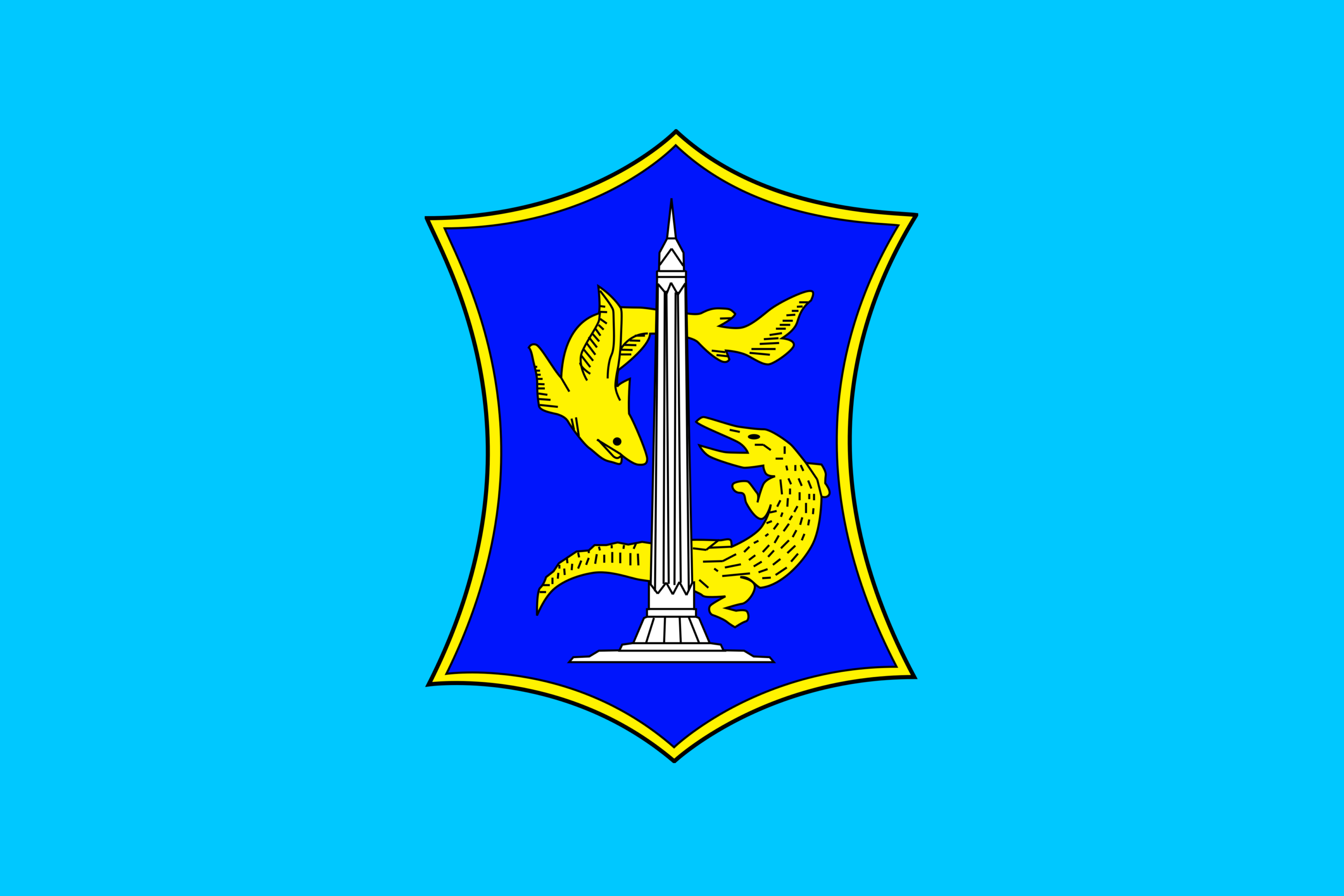
Surabaya

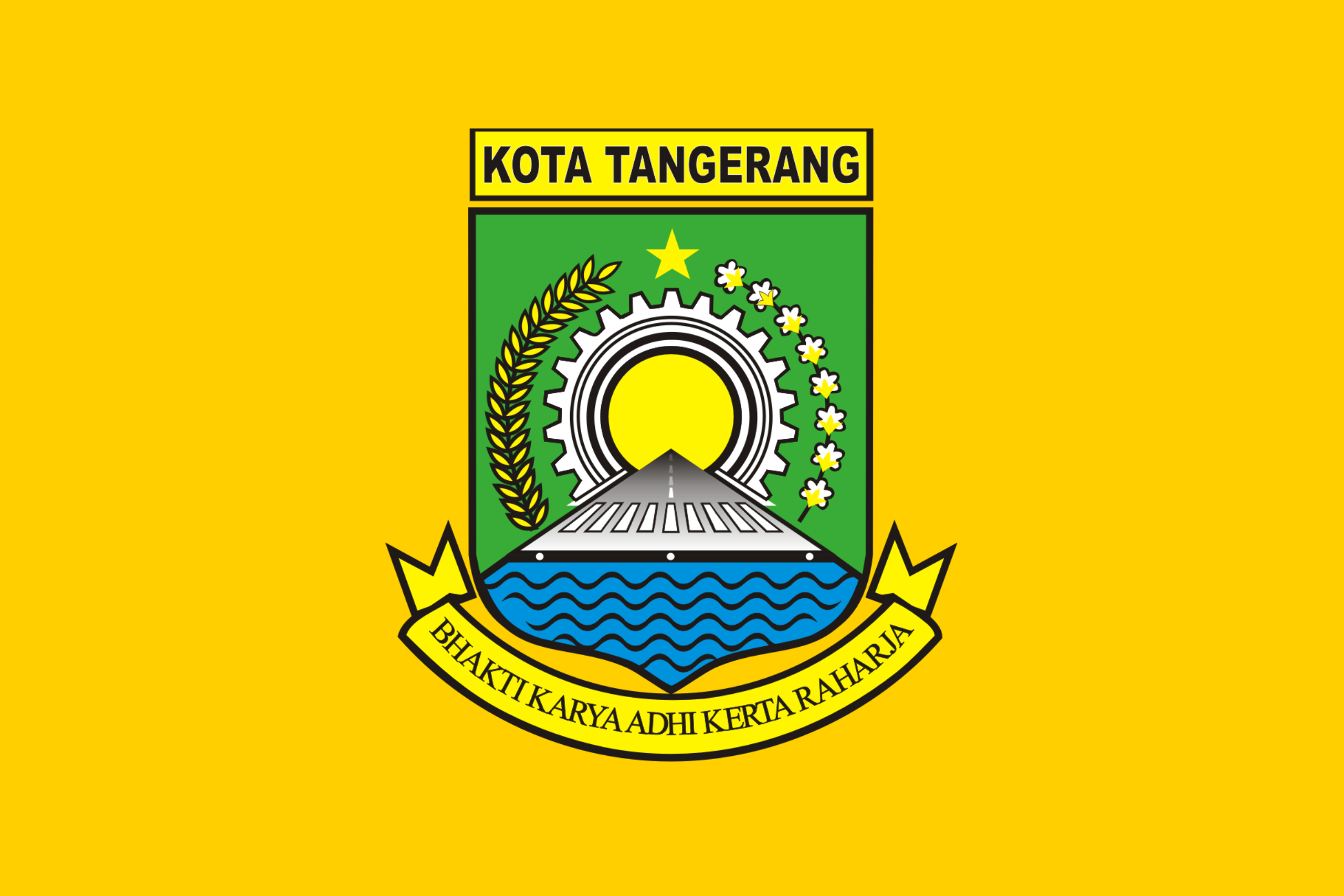
Tangerang

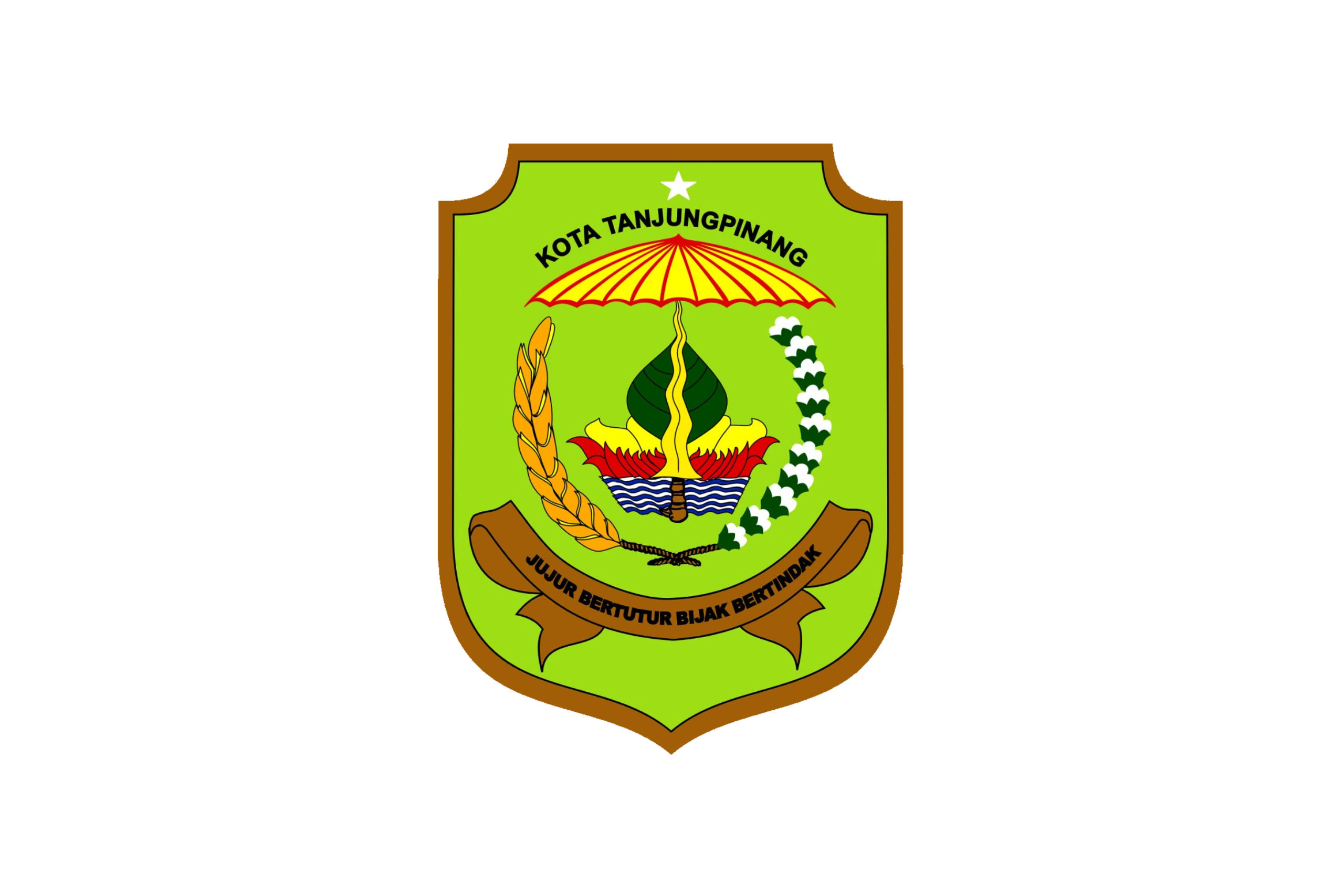
Tanjungpinang

Tasikmalaya

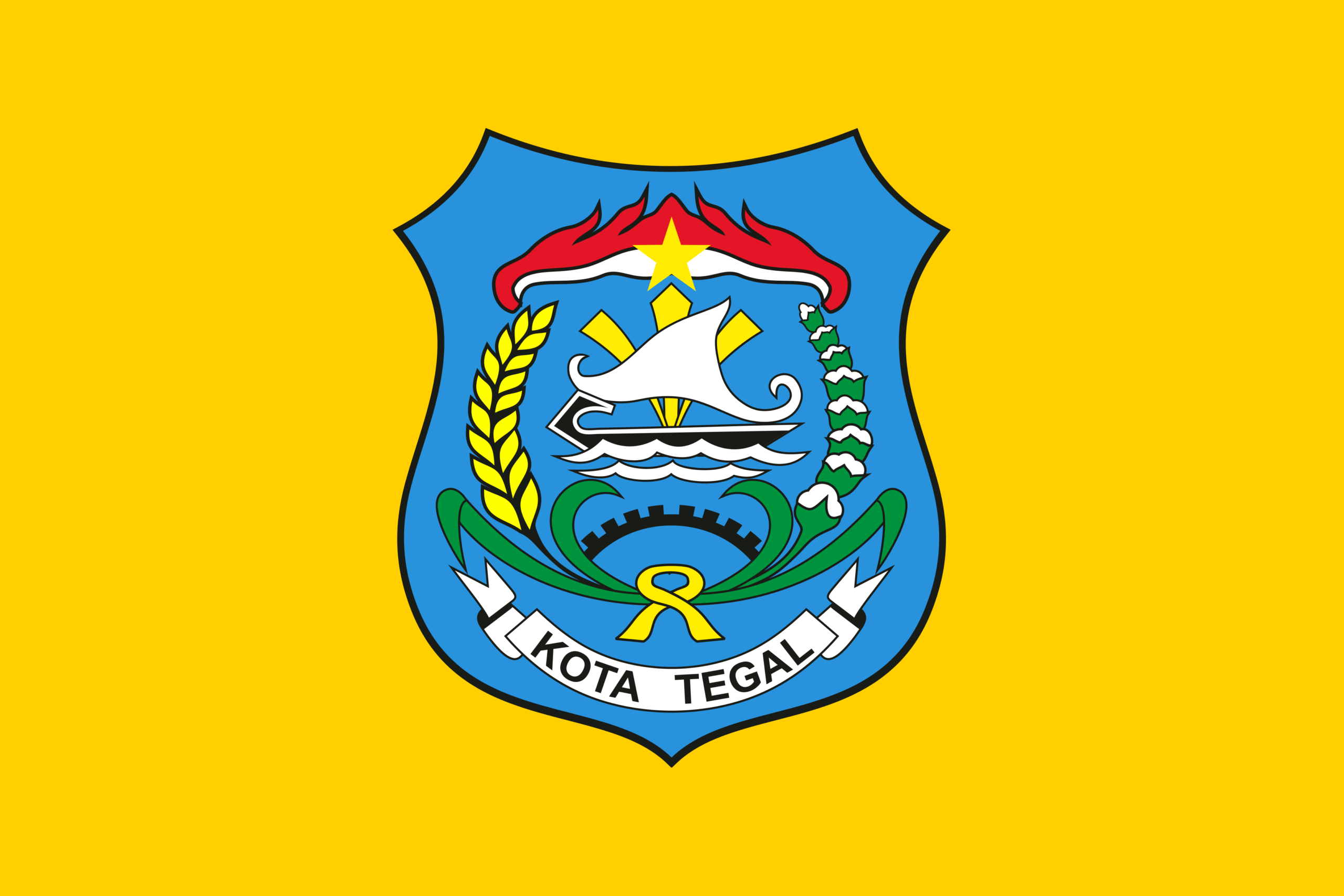
Tegal

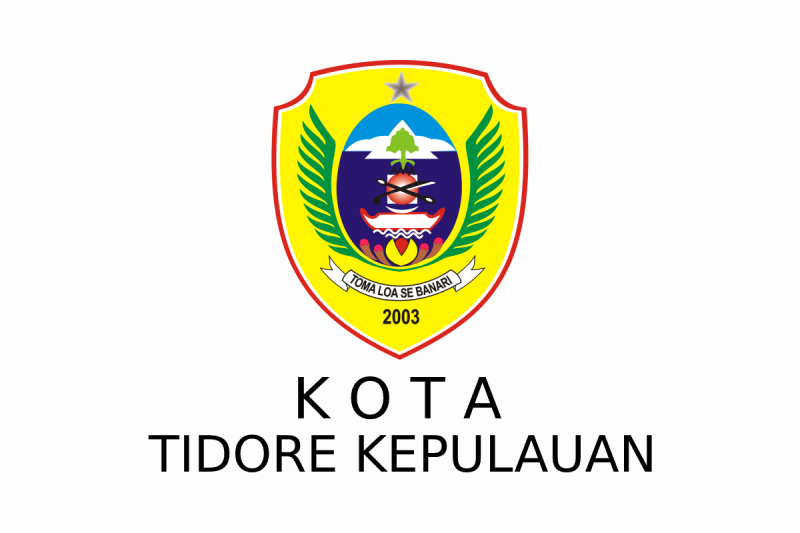
Tidore

Yogyakarta

=== Malaysia ===
Alor Setar

George Town

Ipoh

Johor Bahru

Kota Kinabalu

Kuala Lumpur (details)

Kuala Terengganu

Labuan

Malacca City

Muar

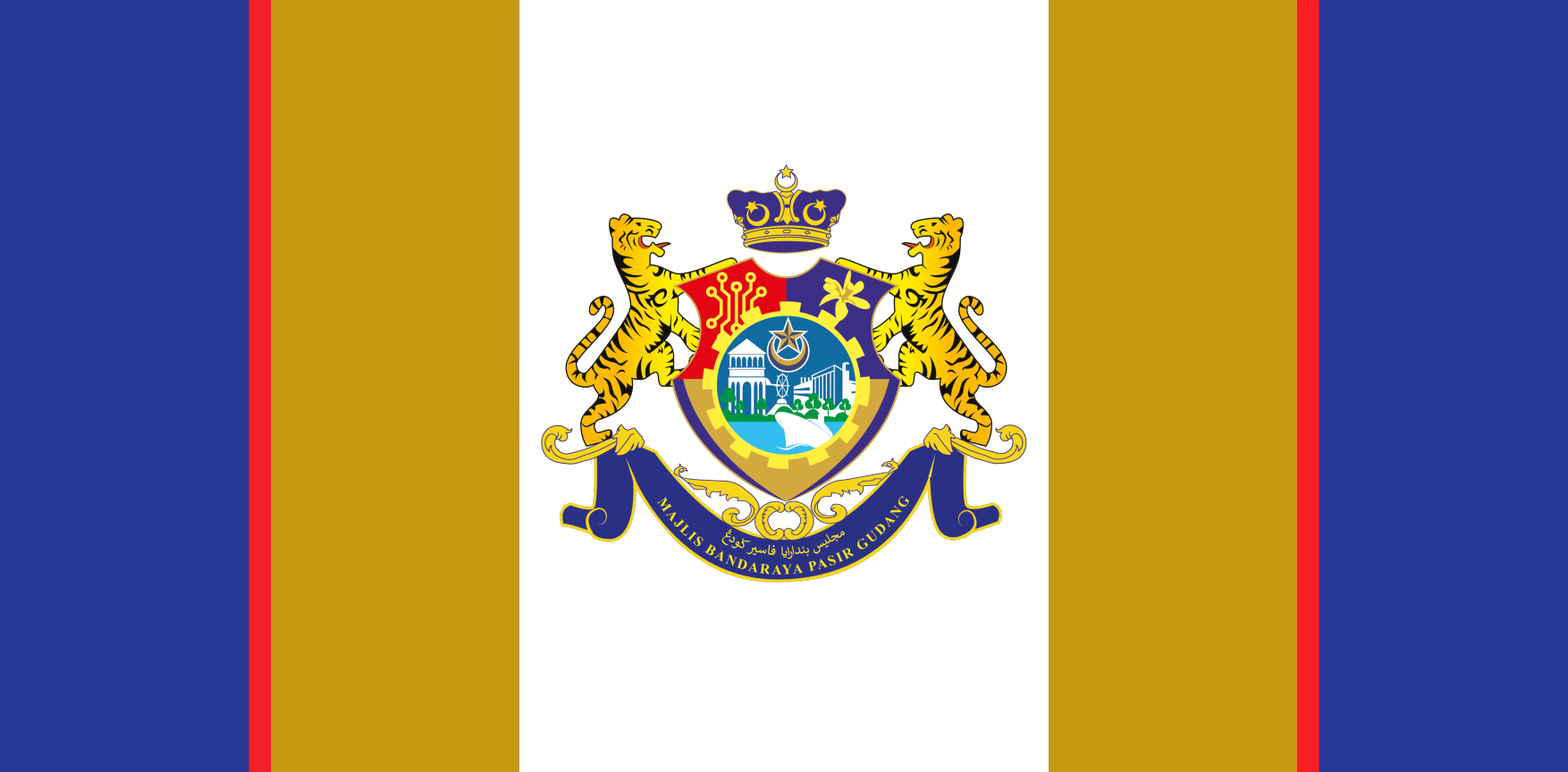
Pasir Gudang

Putrajaya

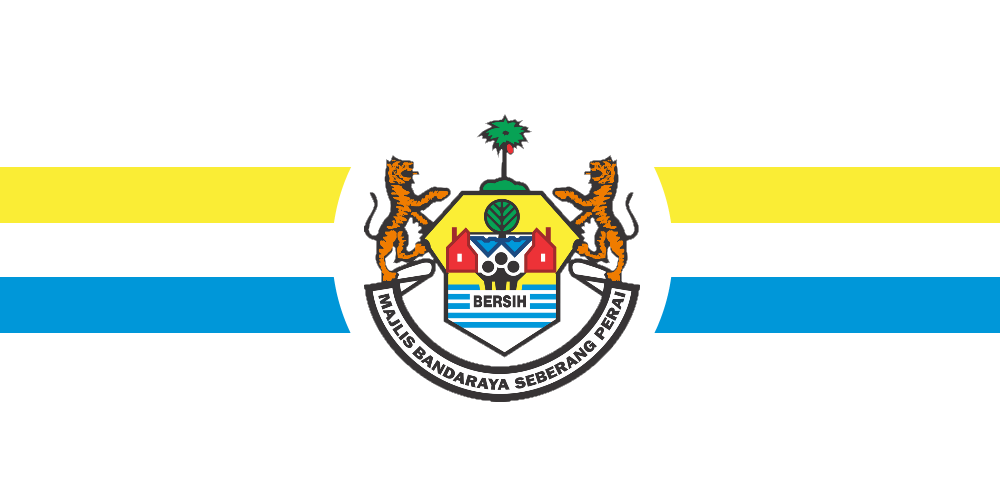
Seberang Perai

Seremban

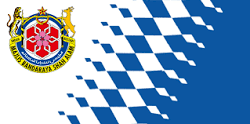
Shah Alam

==== Historical ====
Labuan (1912-1946)

=== Myanmar ===
Mandalay

Naypyidaw

Yangon

=== Singapore ===
Singapore (details)

==== Historical ====
Singapore (early 20th century)

Singapore (1946-1952)

Singapore (1952-1959)

=== Thailand ===
Bangkok

Chiang Mai

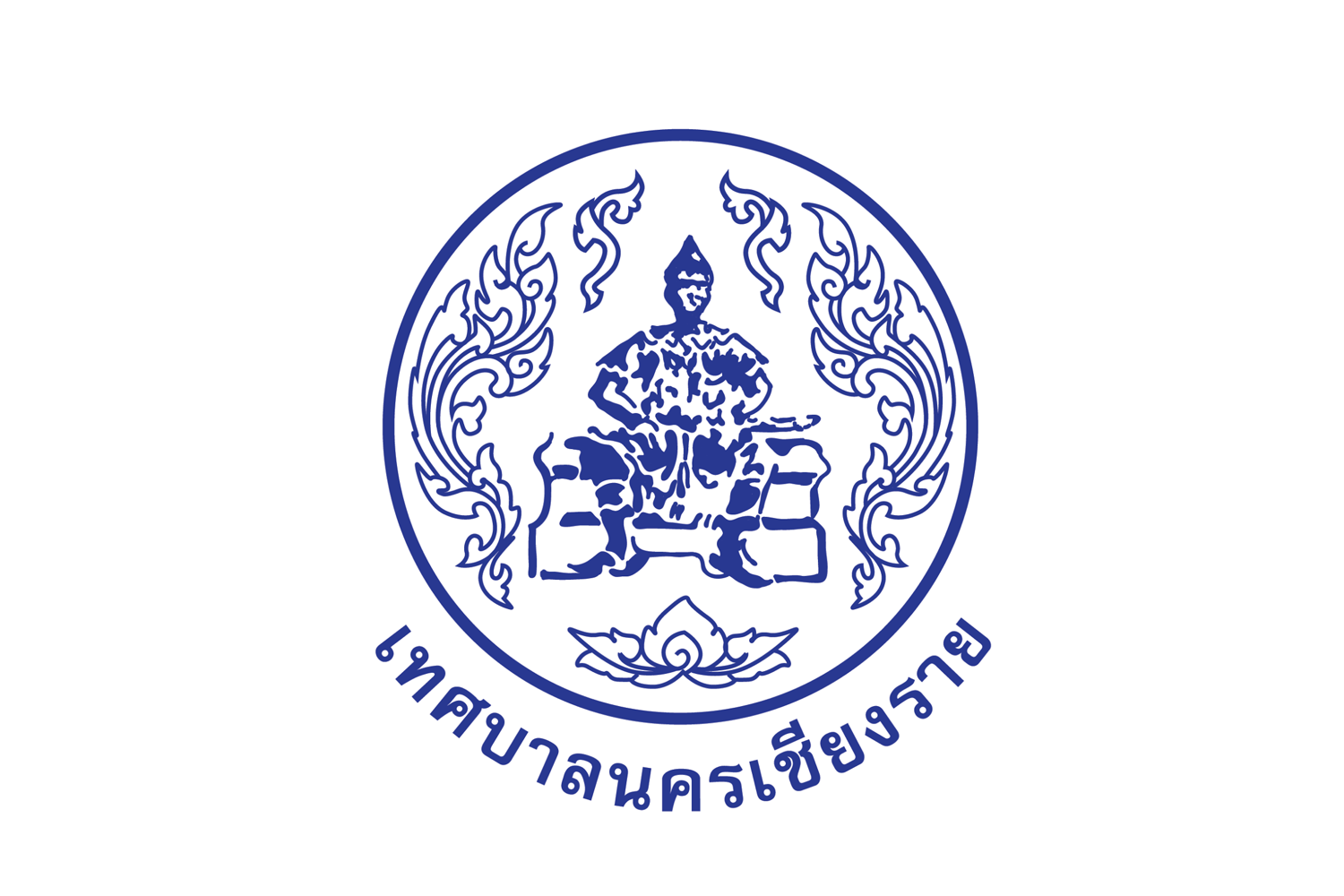
Chiang Rai

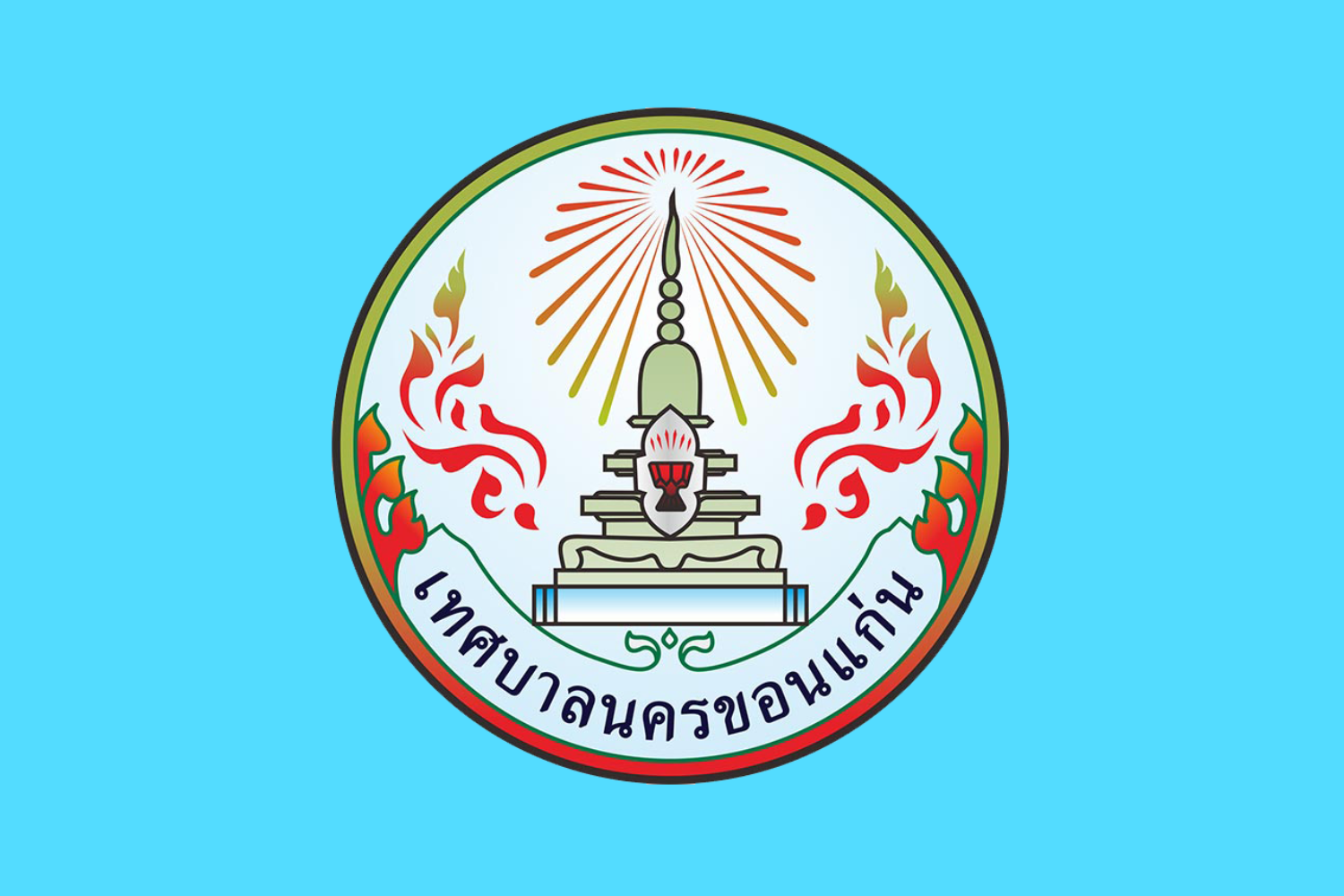
Khon Kaen

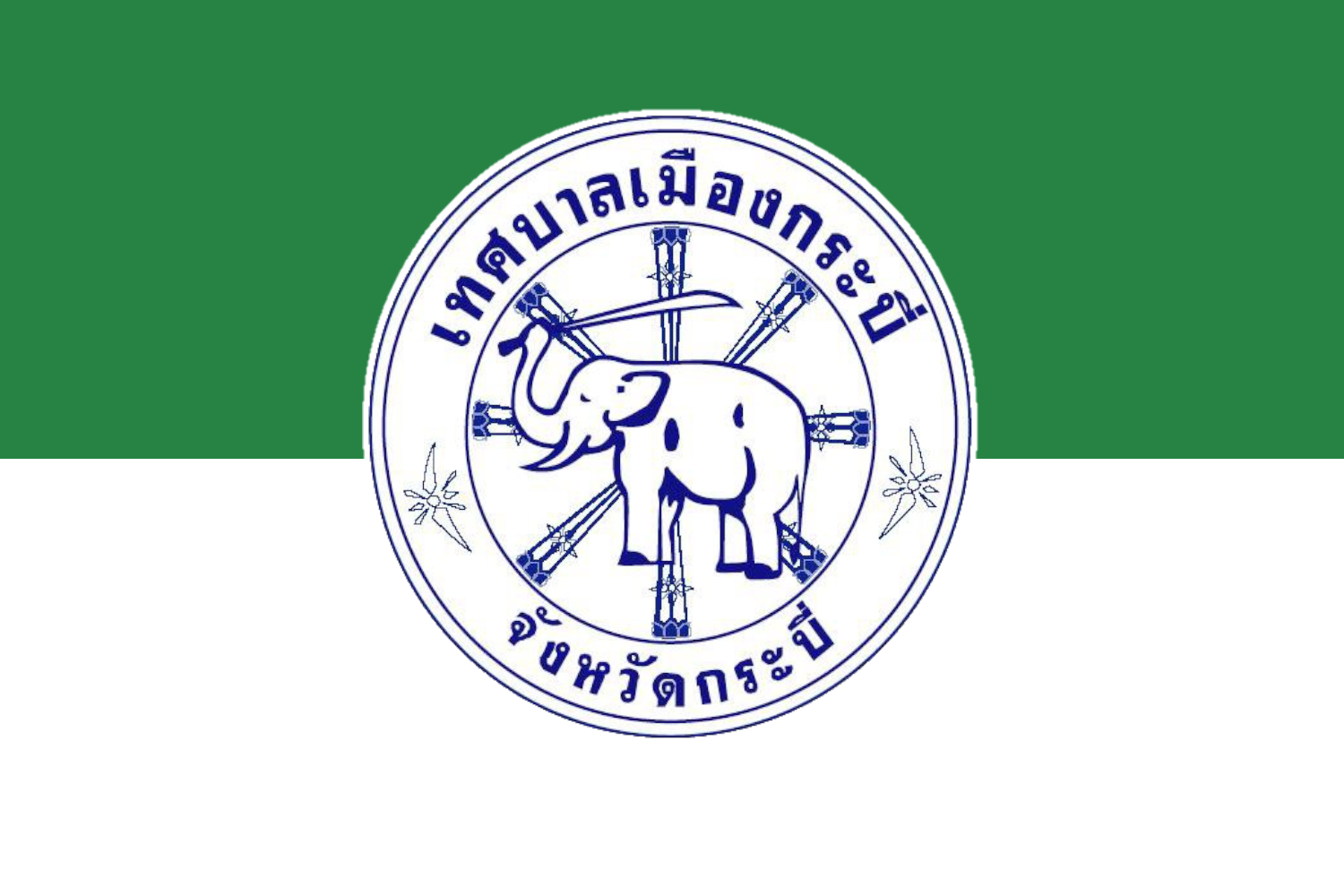
Krabi

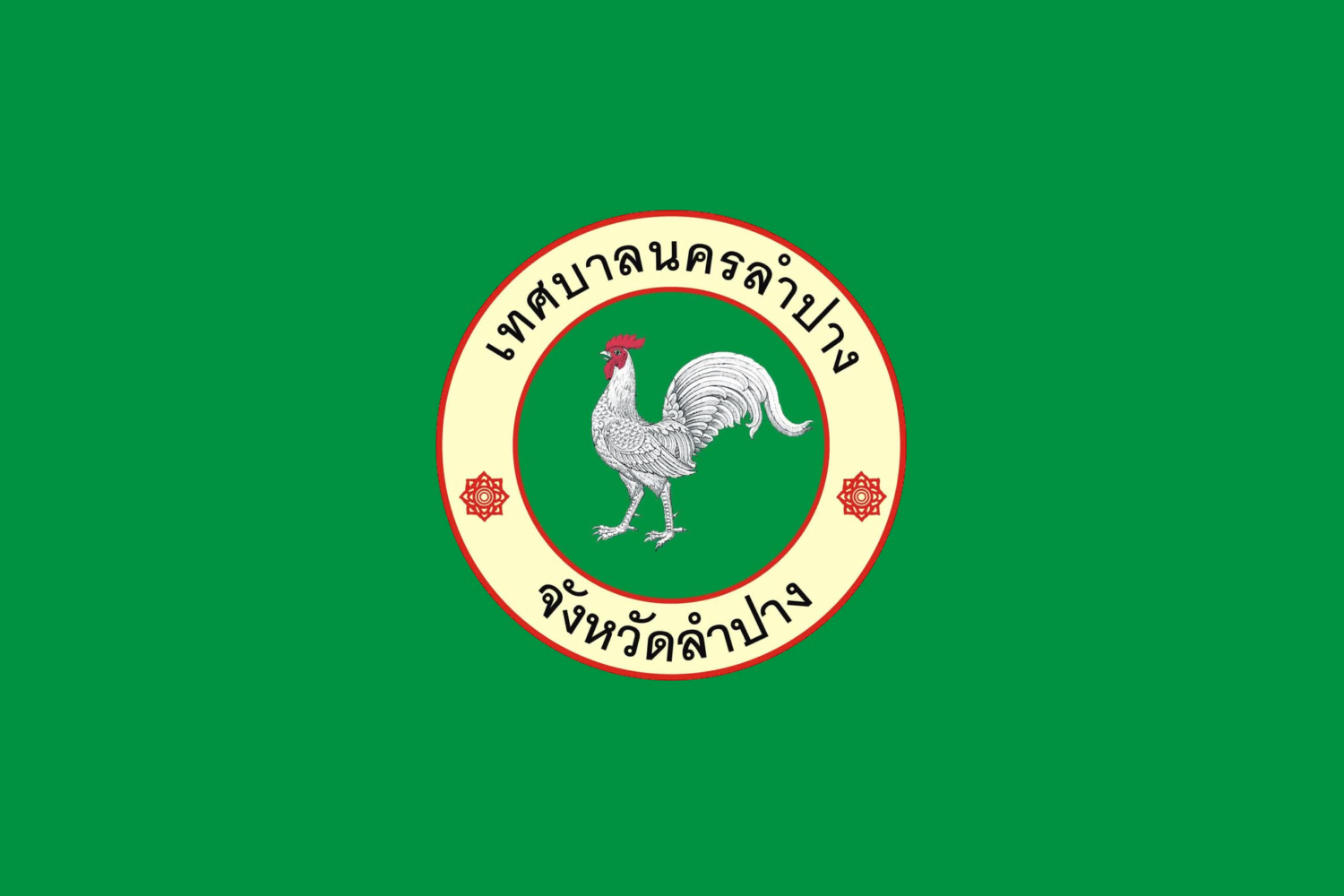
Lampang

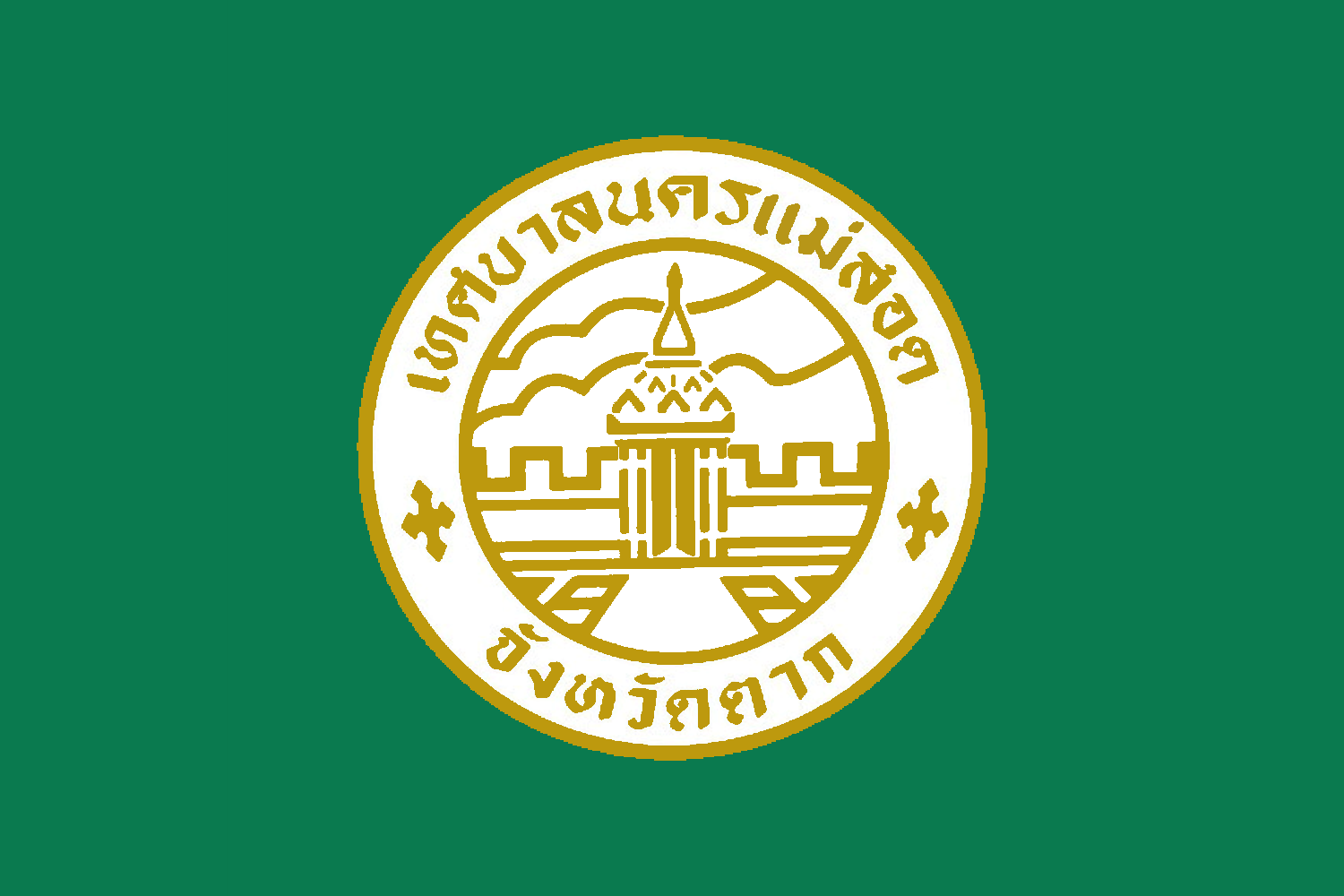
Mae Sot

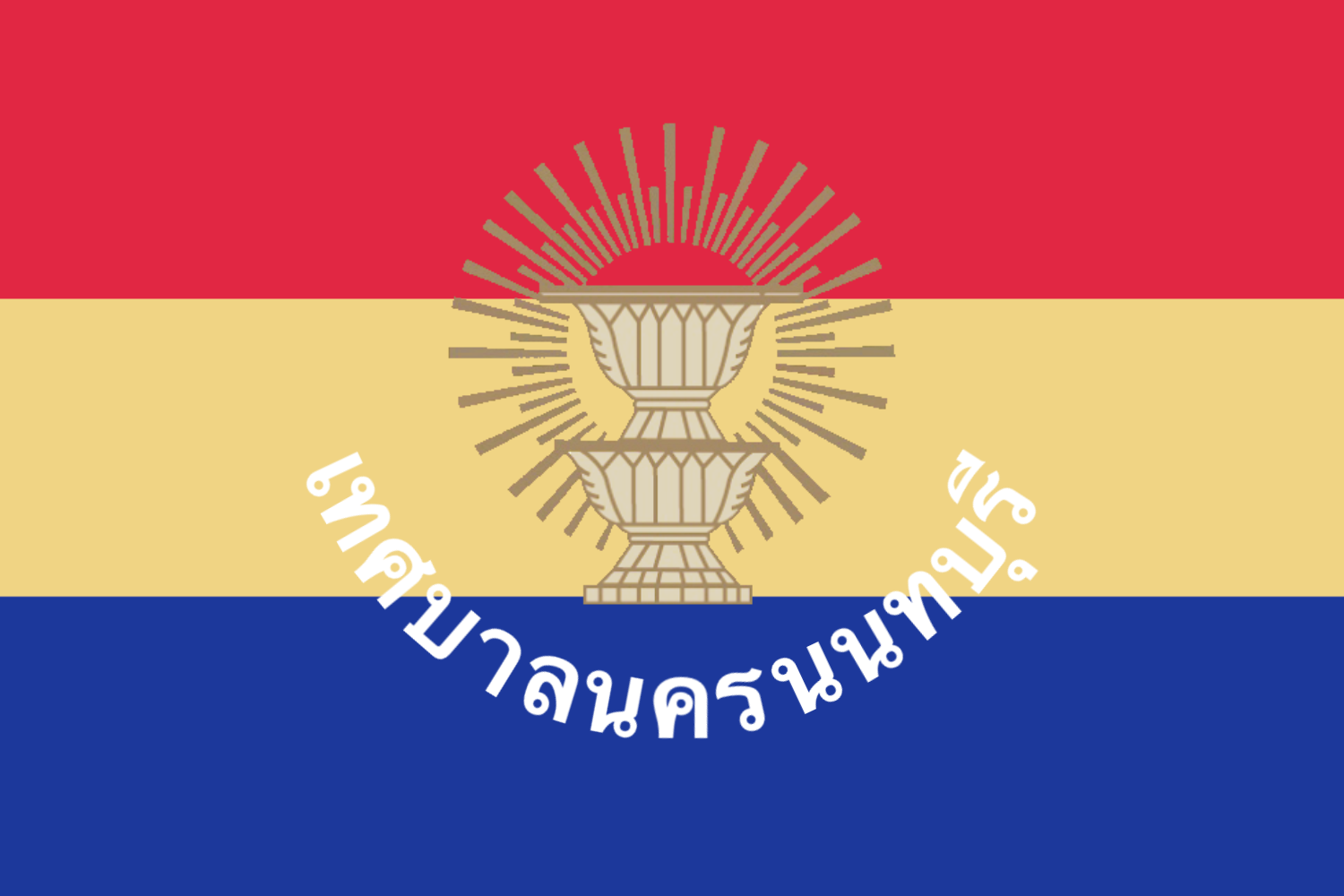
Nonthaburi

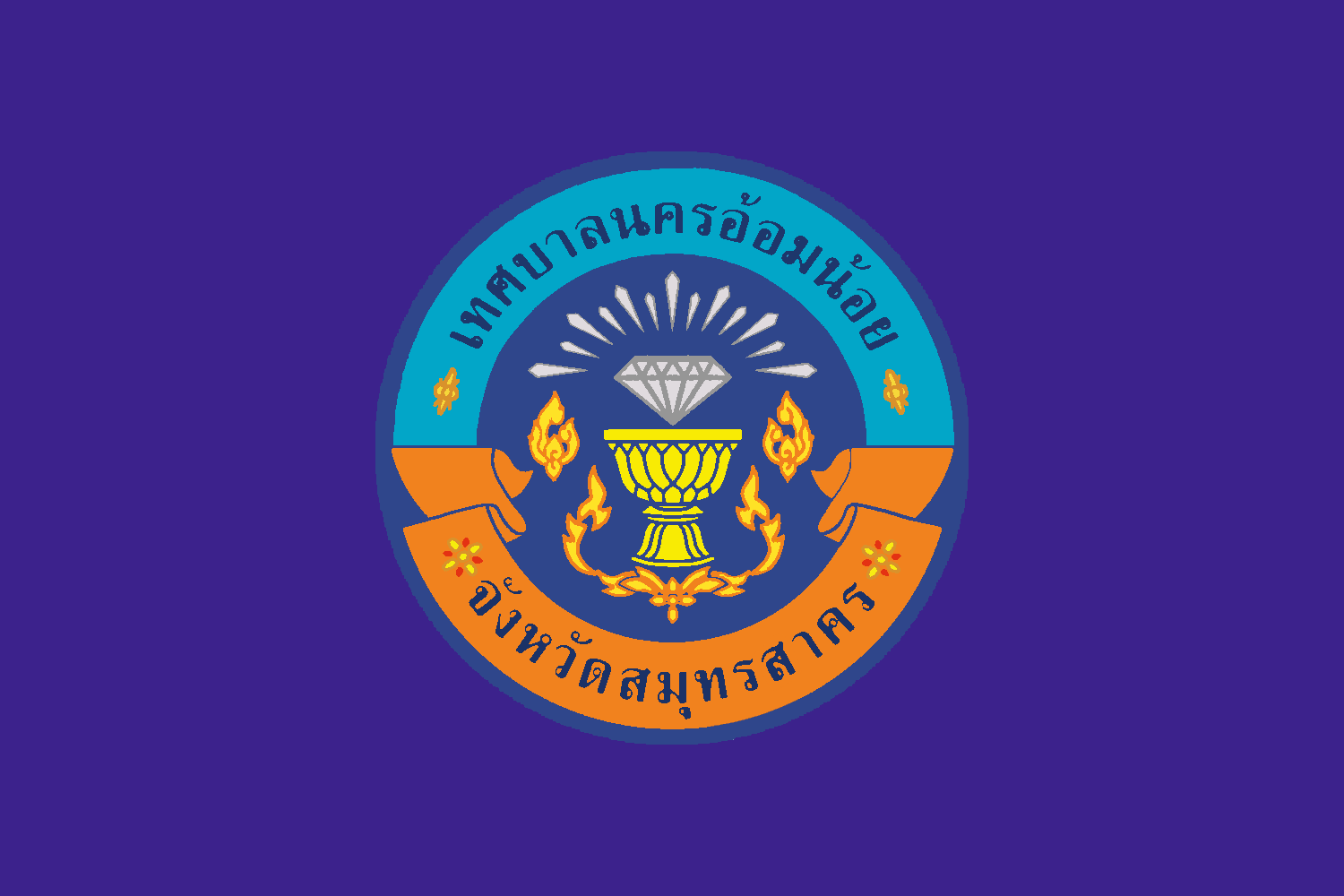
Om Noi

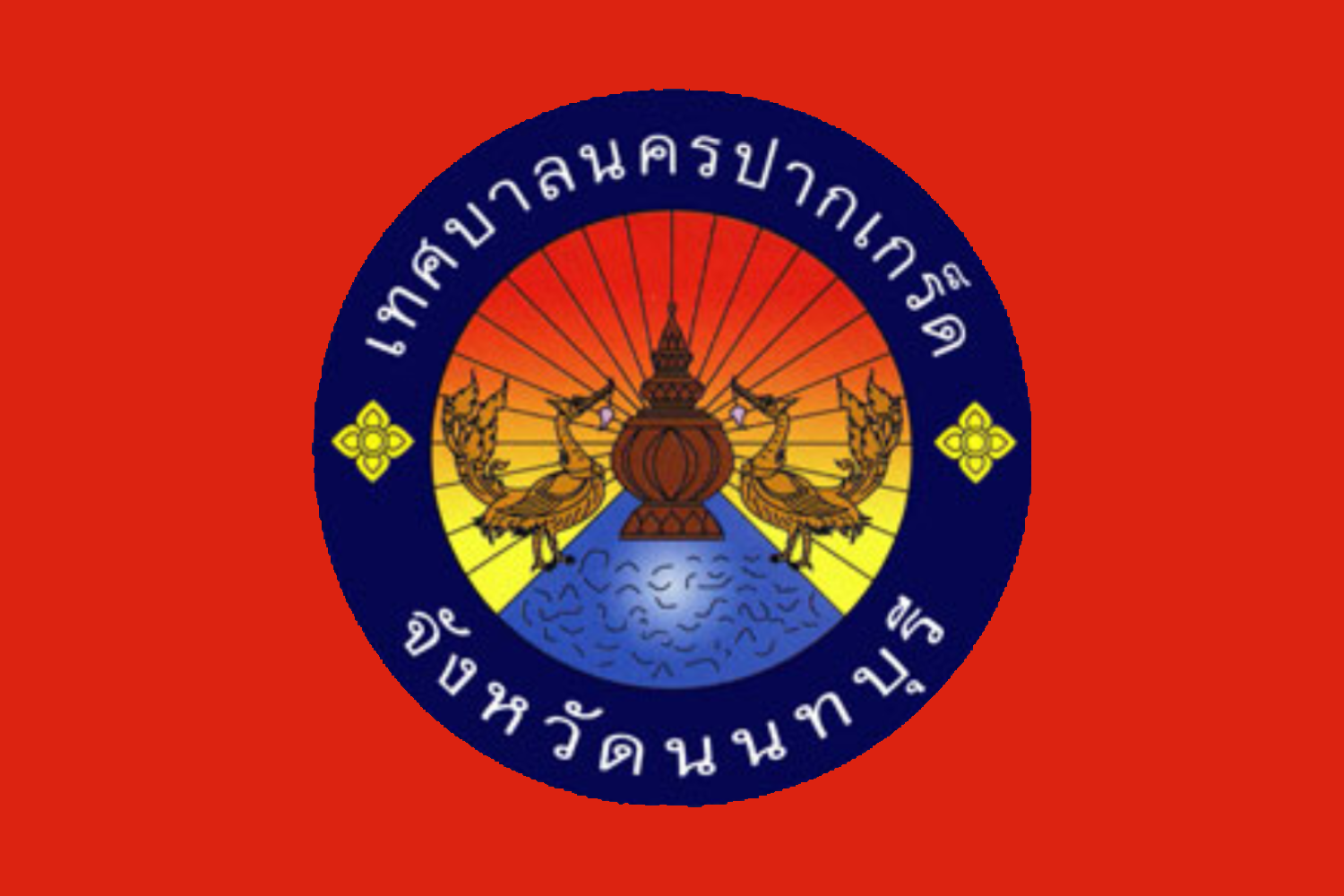
Pak Kret

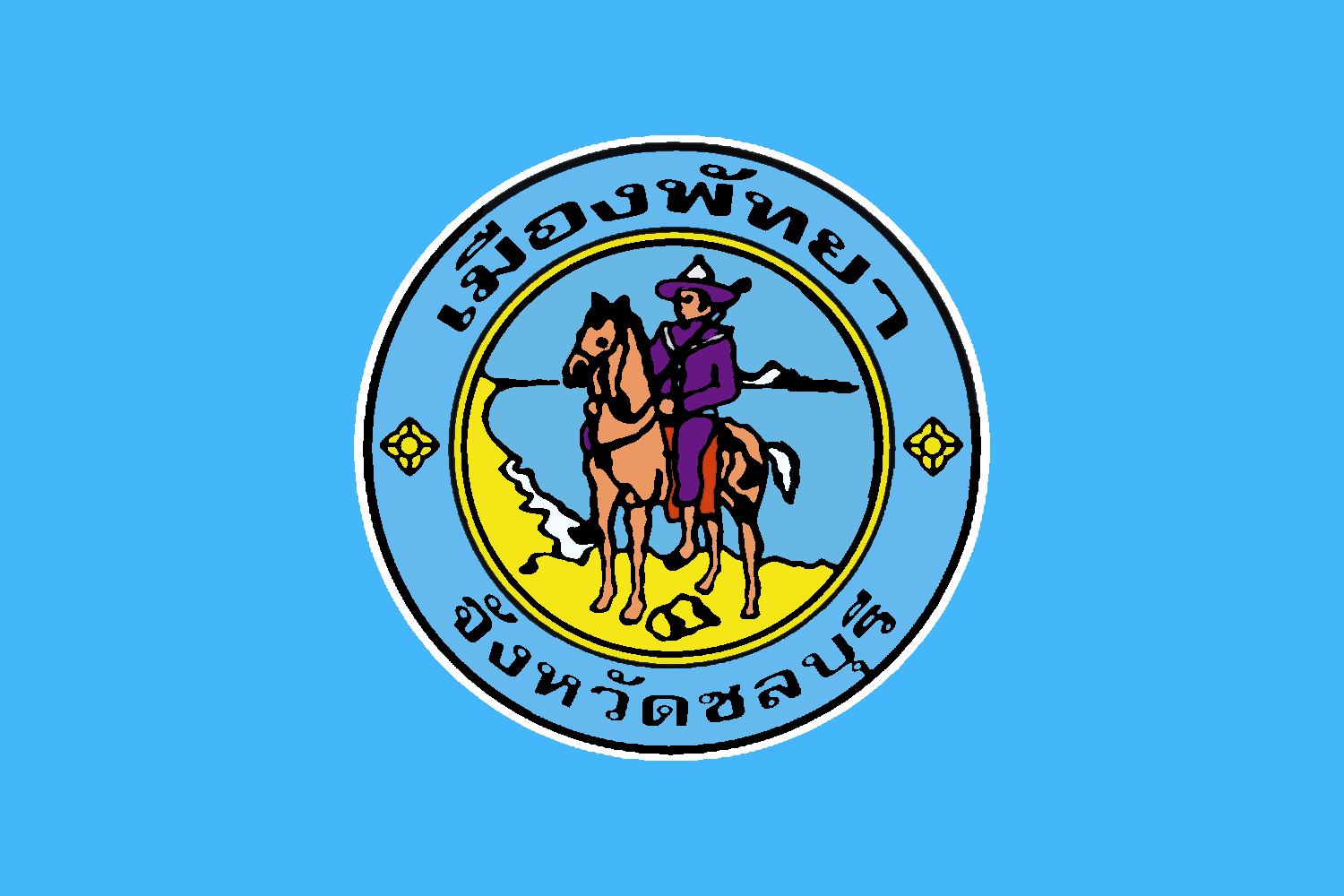
Pattaya

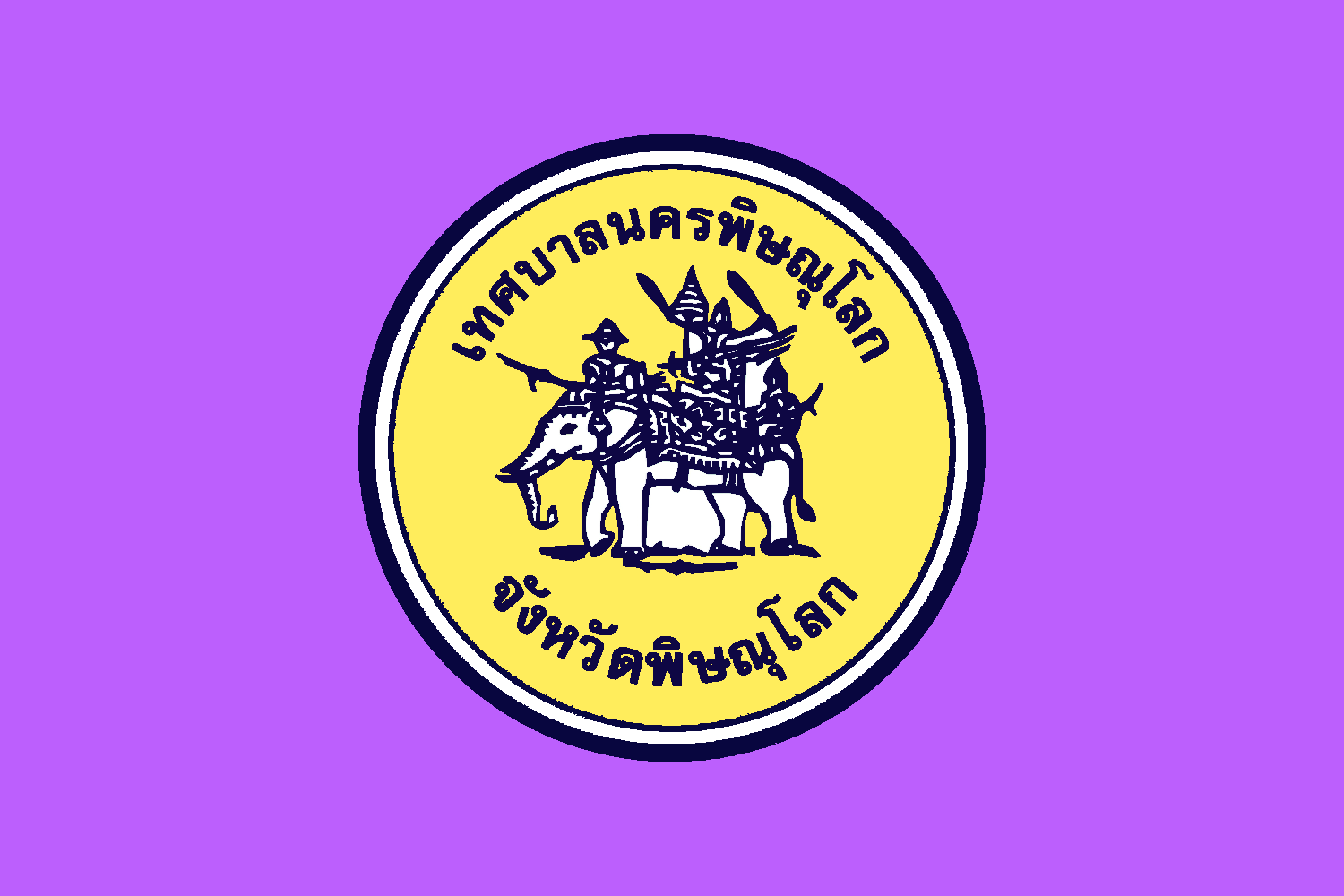
Phitsanulok

Phuket

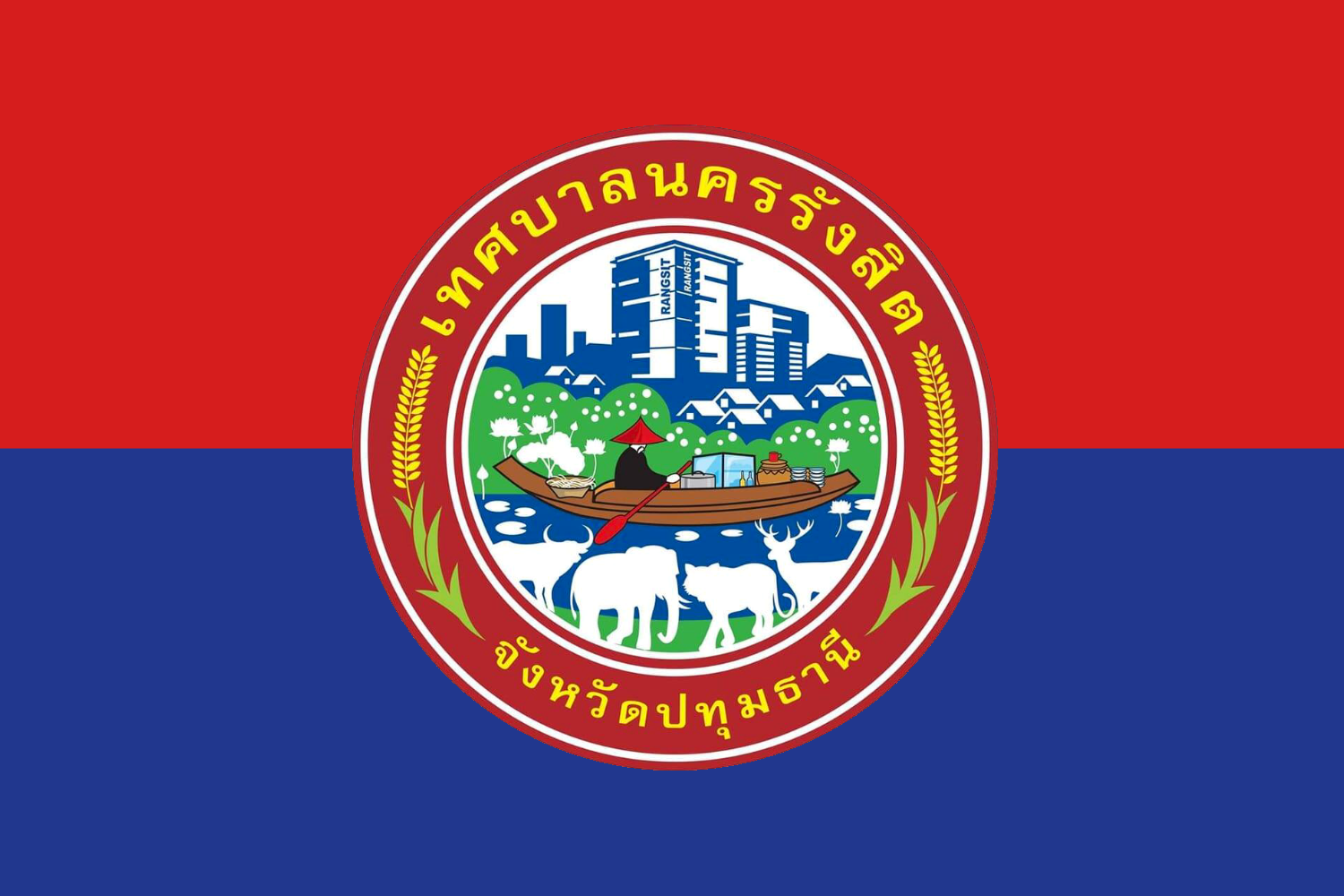
Rangsit

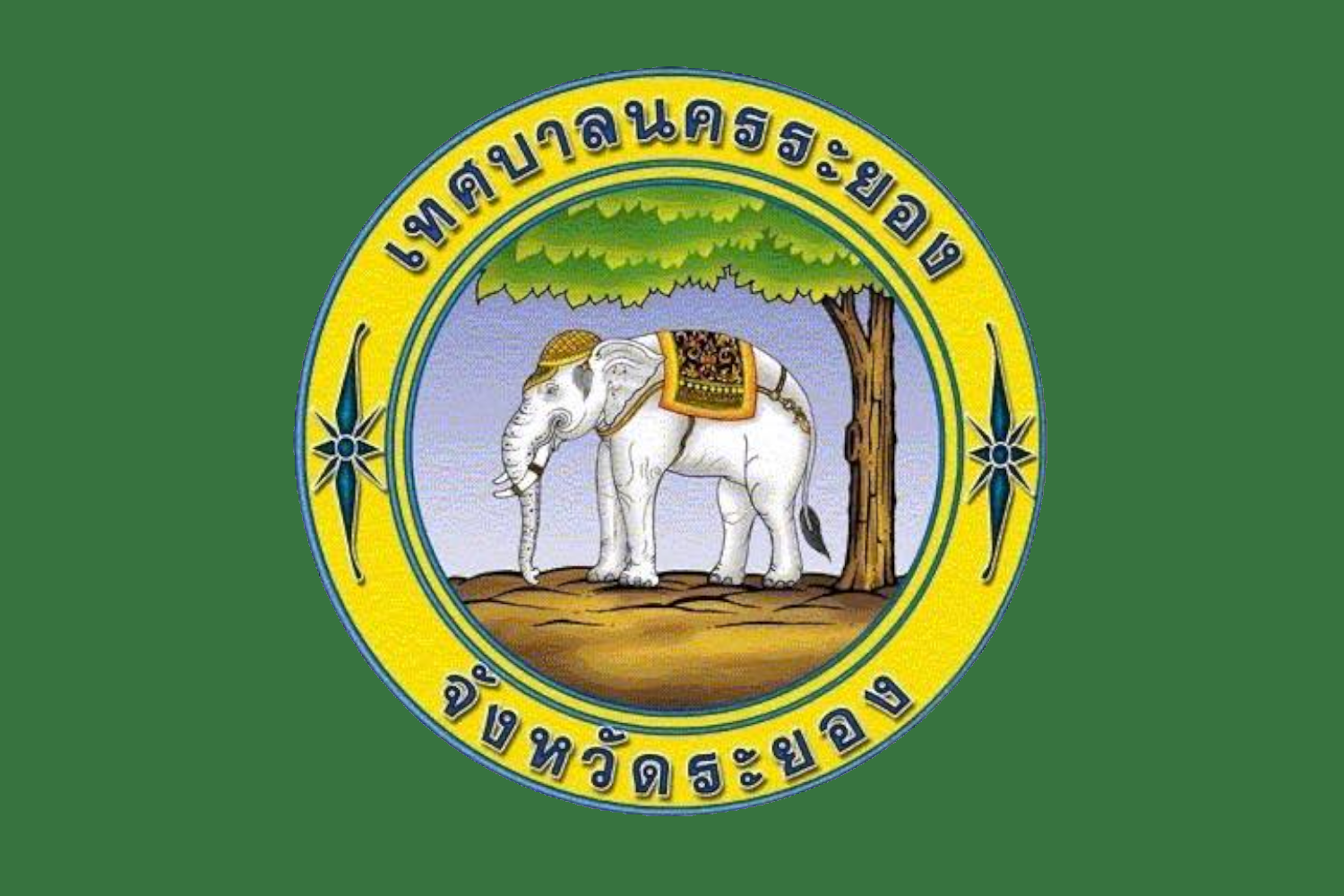
Rayong

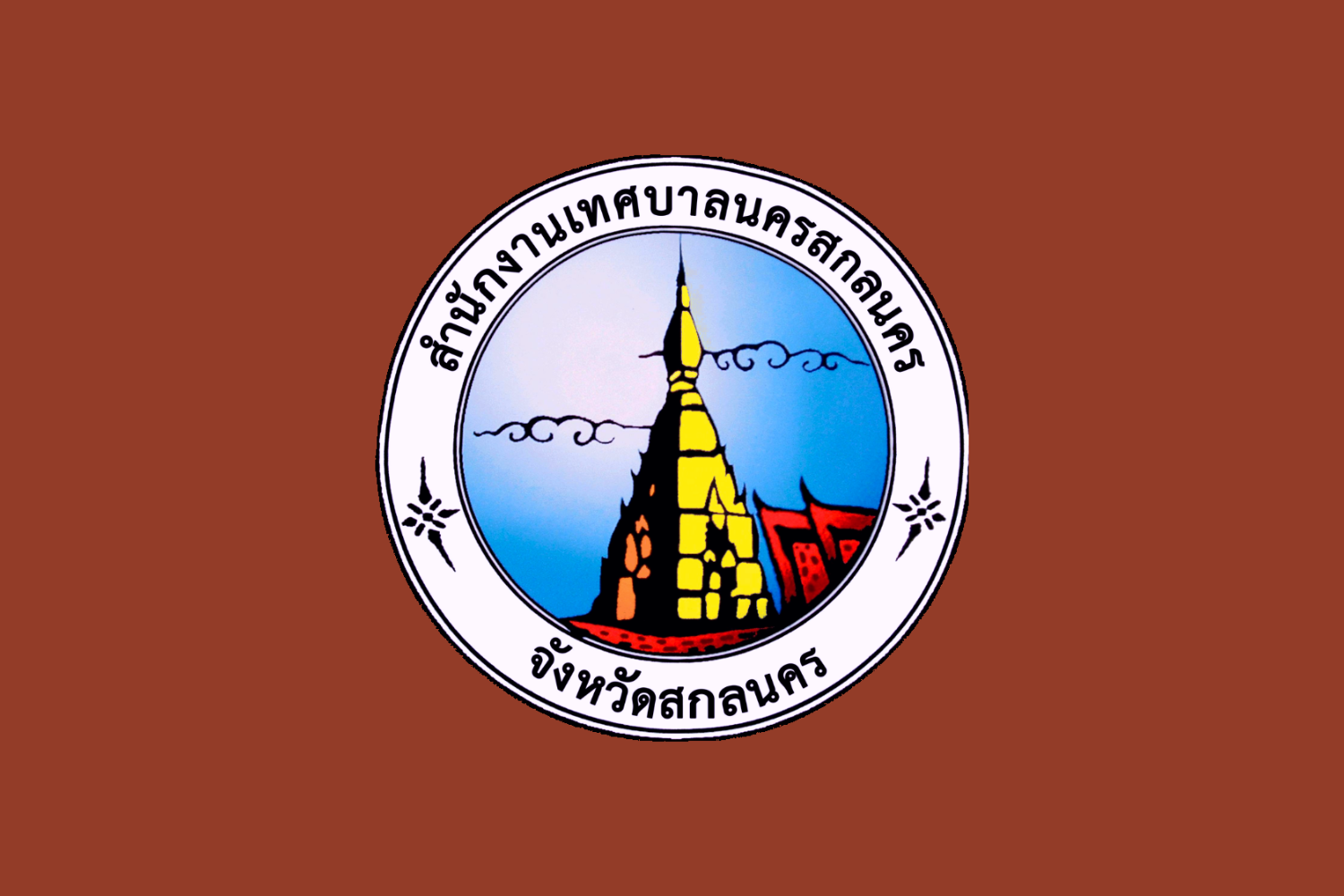
Sakon Nakhon

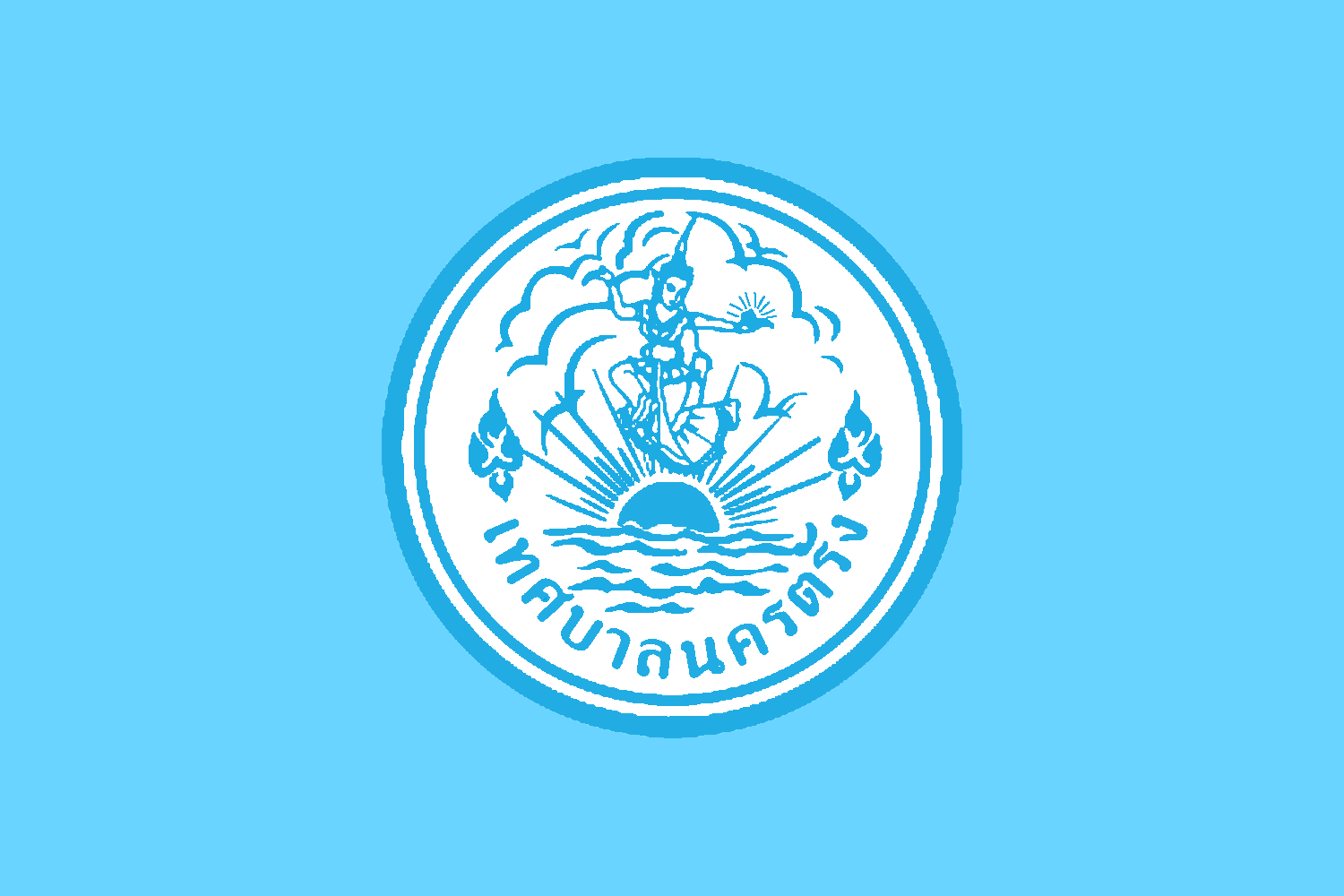
Trang

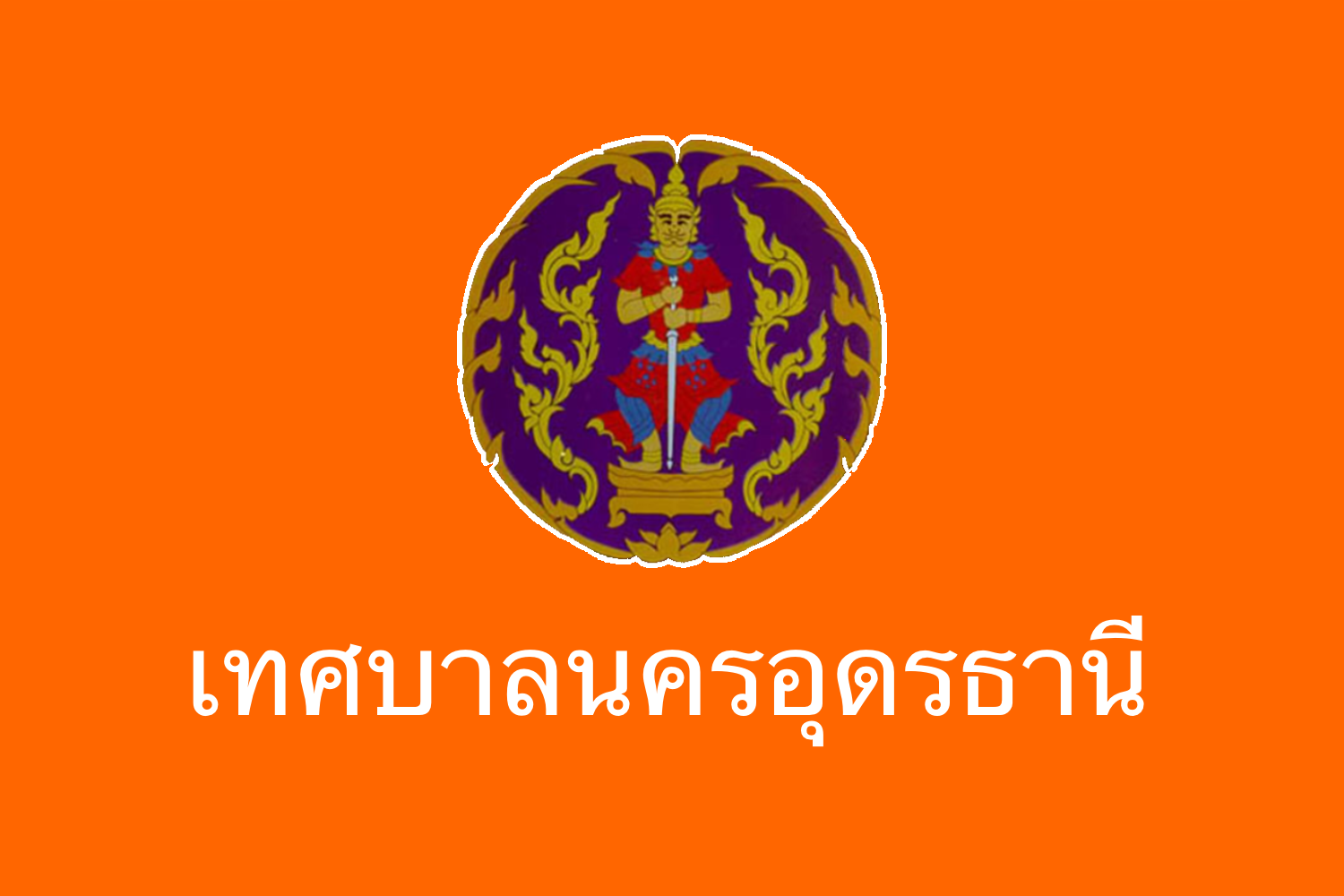
Udon Thani

=== Timor-Leste ===
==== Historical ====
Dili (1952-1975)

Dili (2009, 2014, proposed)

== See also ==
- List of city flags in Africa
- List of city flags in Europe
- List of city flags in North America
- List of city flags in Oceania
- List of city flags in South America
