= Hussein of Jordan =

King of Jordan from 1952 to 1999

Hussein
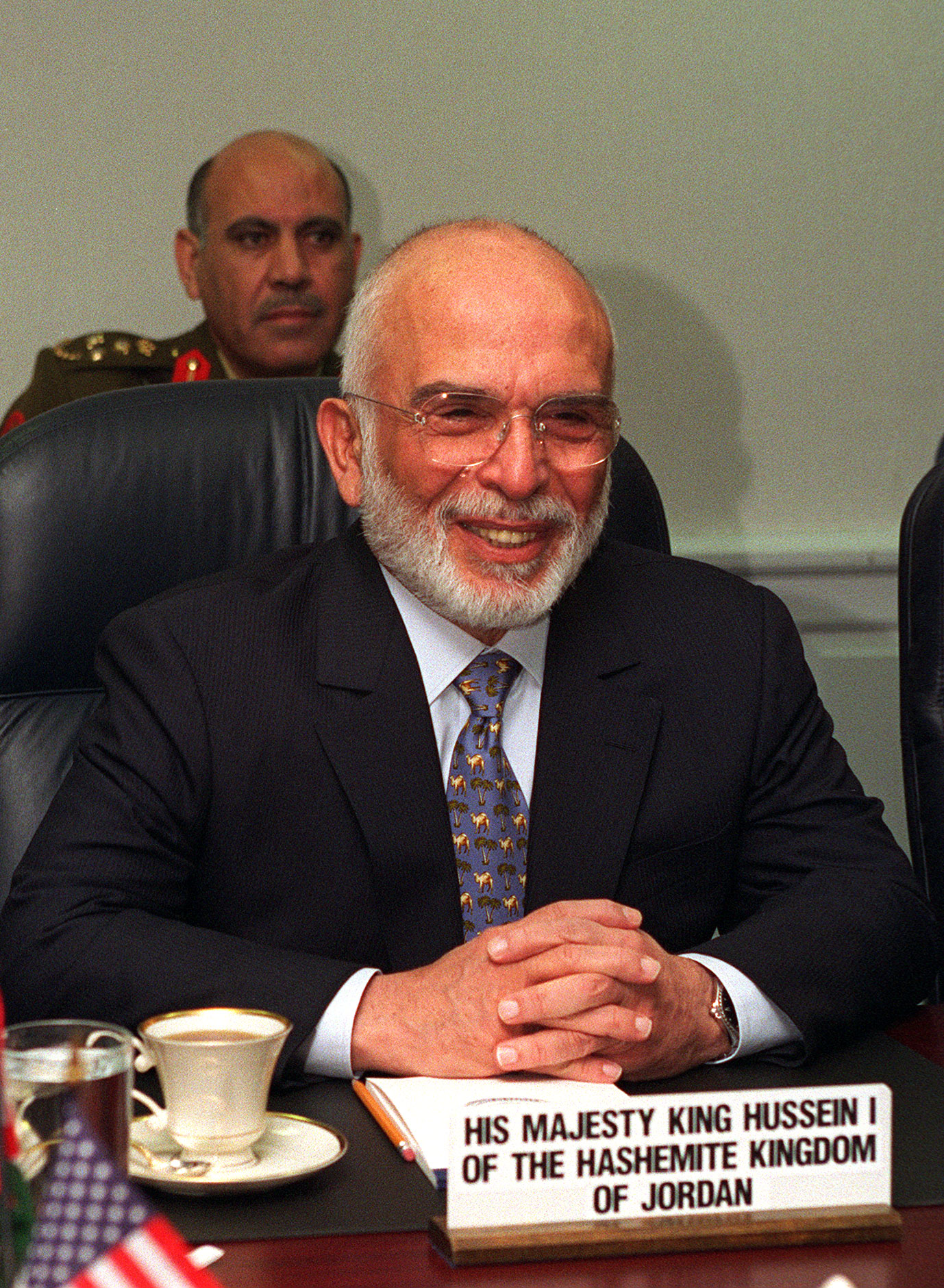
- Hussein in 1997

King of Jordan
- Reign: 11 August 1952 – 7 February 1999
- Regency ended: 2 May 1953
- Predecessor: Talal
- Successor: Abdullah II
- Prime ministers: See list: Fawzi Al-Mulki; Tawfik Abu Al-Huda; Sa`id Al-Mufti; Hazza' Majali; Ibrahim Hashem; Samir Al-Rifai; Suleiman Nabulsi; Husayn Al-Khalidi; Bahjat Talhouni; Wasfi Tal; Hussein ibn Nasser; Saad Jumaa; Abdelmunim Al-Rifai; Mohammad Al-Abbasi; Ahmad Toukan; Ahmad Lozi; Zaid Al-Rifai; Mudar Badran; Abdelhamid Sharaf; Kassim Al-Rimawi; Ahmad Obeidat; Zaid ibn Shaker; Taher Al-Masri; Abdelsalam Al-Majali; Abdul Karim Al-Kabariti; Fayez Tarawneh
- Born: 14 November 1935; Amman, Transjordan
- Died: 7 February 1999 (aged 63); Amman, Jordan
- Burial: 8 February 1999; Raghadan Palace
- Spouses: Dina bint Abdul-Hamid (m. 1955; div. 1957); Toni Gardiner (m. 1961; div. 1972); Alia Toukan (m. 1972; died 1977); Lisa Halaby (m. 1978)
- Issue Details: Princess Alia; Abdullah II; Prince Faisal; Princess Aisha; Princess Zein; Princess Haya; Prince Ali; Abir Muhaisen (adopted); Hamzah bin Hussein; Prince Hashim; Princess Iman; Princess Raiyah
Names
- Hussein bin Talal
- House: Hashemite
- Father: Talal of Jordan
- Mother: Zein al-Sharaf
- Religion: Sunni Islam
- Military career
- Branch: Jordanian Army; Jordanian Navy; Jordanian Air Force
- Service years: 1952–1999
- Rank: Field marshal

Hussein (né Hussein bin Talal; Arabic: الحسين بن طلال; 14 November 1935 – 7 February 1999) was King of Jordan from 1952 until his death in 1999. A member of the Hashemite dynasty, he is regarded as a 40th-generation descendant of the Islamic prophet Muhammad.

Hussein was born in Amman as the eldest child of Talal bin Abdullah and Zein al-Sharaf bint Jamil. Talal was at that time the heir to his own father, King Abdullah I. Hussein began his schooling in Amman, continuing his education abroad. After Talal became king in 1951, Hussein was named heir apparent. The Jordanian Parliament forced Talal to abdicate a year later due to his mental illness, and a regency council was appointed until Hussein came of age. He was enthroned at the age of 17 in 1953. Hussein was married four separate times and fathered eleven children.

Hussein, a constitutional monarch, started his rule by allowing the formation of the only democratically elected government in Jordan's history in 1956, which he forced to resign a few months later, declaring martial law and banning political parties. Under Hussein, Jordan fought three wars with Israel, including the 1967 Six-Day War, which ended in Jordan's loss of the West Bank. In 1970, Hussein expelled Palestinian militants from Jordan in what became known as Black September. The King renounced Jordan's ties to the West Bank in 1988 after the Palestine Liberation Organization was recognized internationally as the sole representative of the Palestinians. He lifted martial law and reintroduced elections in 1989 when riots over price hikes spread in southern Jordan. In 1994 he became the second Arab head of state to sign a peace treaty with Israel.

At the time of Hussein's accession in 1953, Jordan was a young nation and controlled the West Bank. The country had few natural resources, and a large Palestinian refugee population as a result of the 1948 Palestine War. Hussein led his country through four turbulent decades of the Arab–Israeli conflict and the Cold War, successfully balancing pressures from Arab nationalists, Islamists, the Soviet Union, Western countries, and Israel, transforming Jordan by the end of his 46-year reign into a stable modern state. After 1967 he engaged in efforts to solve the Israeli–Palestinian conflict. He acted as a conciliatory intermediate between various Middle Eastern rivals, and came to be seen as the region's peacemaker. He was revered for pardoning political dissidents and opponents, and giving them senior posts in the government. Hussein, who survived dozens of assassination attempts and plots to overthrow him, was the region's longest-reigning leader. He died at the age of 63 from cancer in 1999 and was succeeded by his eldest son, Abdullah II.

== Early life ==
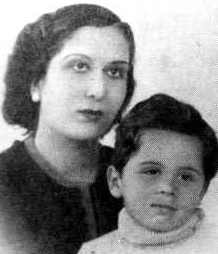
Hussein (age six) and his mother, Zein al-Sharaf, 1941

Hussein was born at Al-Qasr Al-Sagheer at Raghadan Palace in Amman on 14 November 1935 to Crown Prince Talal and Princess Zein al-Sharaf. He was the eldest among his siblings, three brothers and two sisters – Princess Asma, Prince Muhammad, Prince Hassan, Prince Muhsin, and Princess Basma. During one cold Ammani winter, his baby sister Asma died from pneumonia, an indication of how poor his family was then – they could not afford heating in their house.

Hussein was the namesake of his paternal great-grandfather, Hussein bin Ali (Sharif of Mecca), the leader of the 1916 Arab Revolt against the Ottoman Empire. Hussein claimed to be an agnatic descendant of Muhammad's daughter Fatimah and her husband Ali, the fourth caliph, since Hussein belonged to the Hashemite family, which had ruled Mecca for over 700 years – until its 1925 conquest by the House of Saud – and has ruled Jordan since 1921. The Hashemites, the oldest ruling dynasty in the Muslim world, are the second-oldest-ruling dynasty in the world (after the Imperial House of Japan). Hussein's maternal grandmother, Widjan Hanim, was the daughter of Shakir Pasha who was the Ottoman governor of Cyprus.

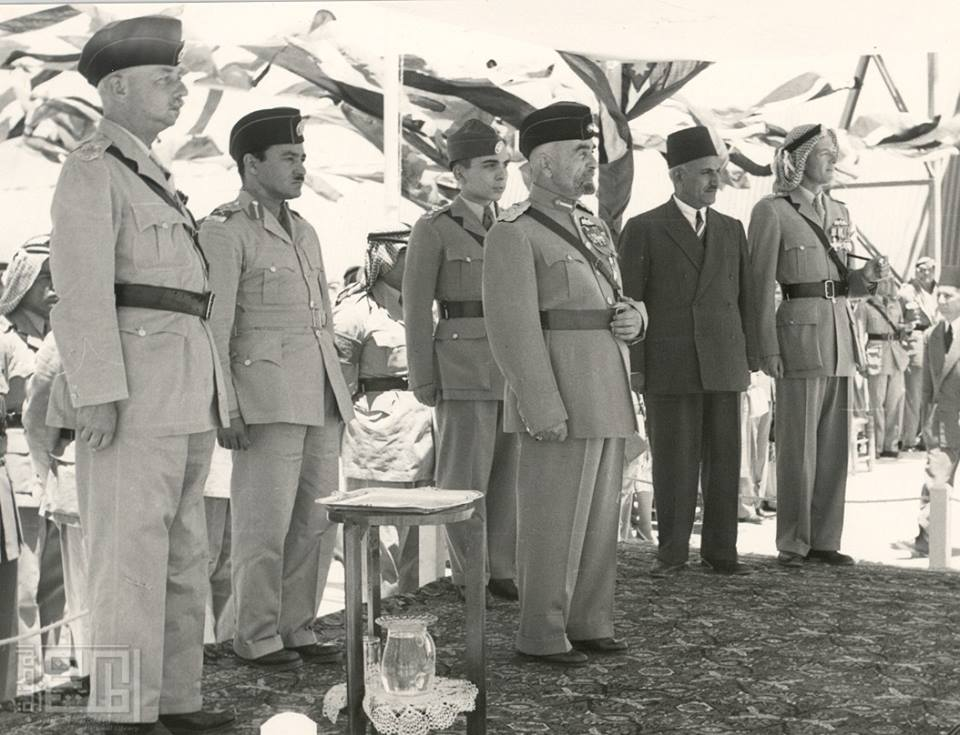
Hussein (age eleven) seen behind his grandfather King Abdullah I after the independence of Jordan was declared, 25 May 1946.

The young prince started his elementary education in Amman. He was then educated at Victoria College in Alexandria, Egypt. He proceeded to Harrow School in England, where he befriended his paternal second cousin Faisal II of Iraq, who was also studying there. Faisal was then King of Hashemite Iraq, but was under regency since he was still a minor.

Hussein's grandfather, King Abdullah I, the founder of modern Jordan, did not see in his two sons Talal and Nayef potential for kingship, and therefore he focused his efforts on the upbringing of his grandson Hussein. A special relationship grew between the two. Abdullah assigned Hussein a private tutor for extra Arabic lessons, and Hussein acted as interpreter for his grandfather during his meetings with foreign leaders, as Abdullah understood English but could not speak it. On 20 July 1951, 15-year-old Prince Hussein travelled to Jerusalem to perform Friday prayers at the Masjid Al-Aqsa with his grandfather. A Palestinian assassin opened fire on Abdullah and his grandson, amid rumours that the King had been planning to sign a peace treaty with the newly established state of Israel. Abdullah died, but Hussein survived the assassination attempt and, according to witnesses, pursued the assassin. Hussein was also shot, but the bullet was deflected by a medal on his uniform that his grandfather had given him.

== Reign ==
=== Accession ===
Abdullah's eldest son, Talal, was proclaimed King of Jordan. Talal appointed his son Hussein as crown prince on 9 September 1951. After a reign lasting less than thirteen months, the Parliament forced King Talal to abdicate due to his mental state – doctors had diagnosed schizophrenia. In his brief reign, Talal had introduced a modern, somewhat liberal constitution in 1952 that is still in use today. Hussein was proclaimed king on 11 August 1952, succeeding to the throne three months before his 17th birthday. A telegram from Jordan was brought in to Hussein while he was staying with his mother abroad in Lausanne, Switzerland, addressed to 'His Majesty King Hussein'. "I did not need to open it to know that my days as a schoolboy were over," Hussein later wrote in his memoirs. He returned home to cheering crowds.

A three-man regency council made up of the prime minister and heads of the Senate and the House of Representatives was appointed until he became 18 (by the Muslim calendar). Meanwhile, Hussein pursued further study at the Royal Military Academy Sandhurst. He was enthroned on 2 May 1953, the same day that his cousin Faisal II assumed his constitutional powers as king of Iraq.

=== First years ===
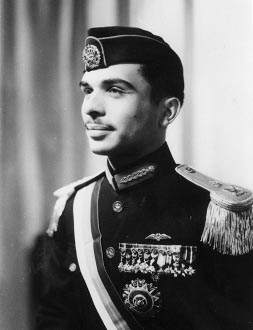
King Hussein in royal ceremonial dress, 1953

The teenaged king inherited the throne not only of Jordan, but also of the West Bank, captured by Jordan during the 1948 Arab–Israeli War and annexed in 1950. The country was poor in natural resources, and had a large Palestinian refugee population resulting from the war – the annexation of the West Bank had made Palestinians two-thirds of the population, outnumbering Jordanians. Upon assuming the throne, he appointed Fawzi Mulki as prime minister. Mulki's liberal policies, including freedom of the press, led to unrest as opposition groups started a propaganda campaign against the monarchy. Palestinian fighters (fedayeen, meaning self-sacrificers) used Jordanian-controlled territory to launch attacks against Israel, sometimes provoking heavy retaliation. One reprisal operation by Israel became known as the Qibya massacre; it resulted in the death of 66 civilians in the West Bank village of Qibya. The incident led to protests, and in 1954 Hussein dismissed Mulki amid the unrest and appointed staunch royalist Tawfik Abu Al-Huda. The country held parliamentary elections in October 1954, while the country's parties were not yet fully organized. Abu Al-Huda lasted only a year, and the government underwent reshuffling three times within the following year.

The 1955 Baghdad Pact was a Western attempt to form a Middle Eastern alliance to counter Soviet influence and Gamal Abdel Nasser's Egypt. Jordan then found itself in the middle of Cold War tensions. Britain, Turkey, and Iraq were members of the pact, and Jordan was pressured by Britain to join. Nasserism (a socialist Pan-Arabist ideology) swept the Arab World in the 1950s, and the proposal to join the pact triggered large riots in the country. Curfews imposed by the Arab Legion did little to alleviate the situation and tensions persisted throughout 1955. The local unrest, periodically fueled by propaganda transmitted from Egyptian radios, was only calmed after the King appointed a new prime minister who promised not to enter the Baghdad Pact. Saudi Arabia found common ground with Egypt in their suspicions of the Hashemites, both in Jordan and in Iraq. The Saudis massed troops near Aqaba on Jordan's southern borders in January 1956, and only withdrew after the British threatened to intervene on Jordan's behalf. Hussein realized that the Arab nationalist trend had dominated Arab politics, and decided to start downgrading Jordan's relationship with the British. On 1 March 1956, Hussein asserted Jordanian independence by Arabizing the army's command: he dismissed Glubb Pasha as the commander of the Arab Legion and replaced all the senior British officers with Jordanians, thereby renaming it into the "Jordan Armed Forces-Arab Army". He annulled the Anglo-Jordanian treaty and replaced British subsidies with Arab aid. Hussein's bold decisions were met with admiration at home and relations with Arab states improved.

=== "A liberal experiment" ===
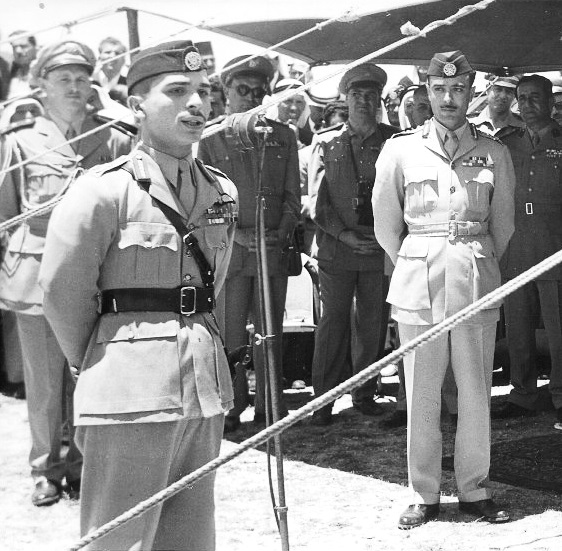
Hussein addressing his troops in 1956, as Ali Abu Nuwar, the army chief of staff, who in 1957 was involved in an alleged coup attempt, observes.

Egyptian president Nasser received an outpouring of support from the Arab public after the Egyptian–Czechoslovak arms deal was signed in September 1955, and his popularity in Jordan skyrocketed following the nationalization of the Suez Canal in July 1956; his actions were seen as a powerful stance against Western imperialism. Hussein was also supportive of the moves. The coinciding events in Egypt had Jordanian leftist opposition parties leaning greatly towards Nasser.

The parliament that had been elected in 1954 was dissolved, and Hussein promised fair elections. The parliamentary election held on 21 October 1956 saw the National Socialist Party emerge as the largest party, winning 12 seats out of 40 in the House of Representatives. Hussein subsequently asked Suleiman Nabulsi, leader of the Party, to form a government, the only democratically elected government in Jordan's history. Hussein called this a "liberal experiment", to see how Jordanians would "react to responsibility". On 29 October 1956, the Suez Crisis erupted in Egypt, as Britain, France, and Israel launched a military offensive to seize control of the canal. Hussein was furious but Nabulsi discouraged him from intervening. Nabulsi's policies frequently clashed with that of King Hussein's, including on how to deal with the Eisenhower Doctrine. The King had requested Nabulsi, as prime minister, to crack down on the Communist Party and the media it controlled. Nabulsi wanted to move Jordan closer to Nasser's regime, but Hussein wanted it to stay in the Western camp.

Disagreements between the monarchy and the leftist government culminated in March 1957 when Nabulsi provided Hussein with a list of senior officers in the military he wanted to dismiss; Hussein initially heeded the recommendations. However, Nabulsi then presented an expanded list, which Hussein refused to act upon. Nabulsi's government was forced to resign on 10 April.

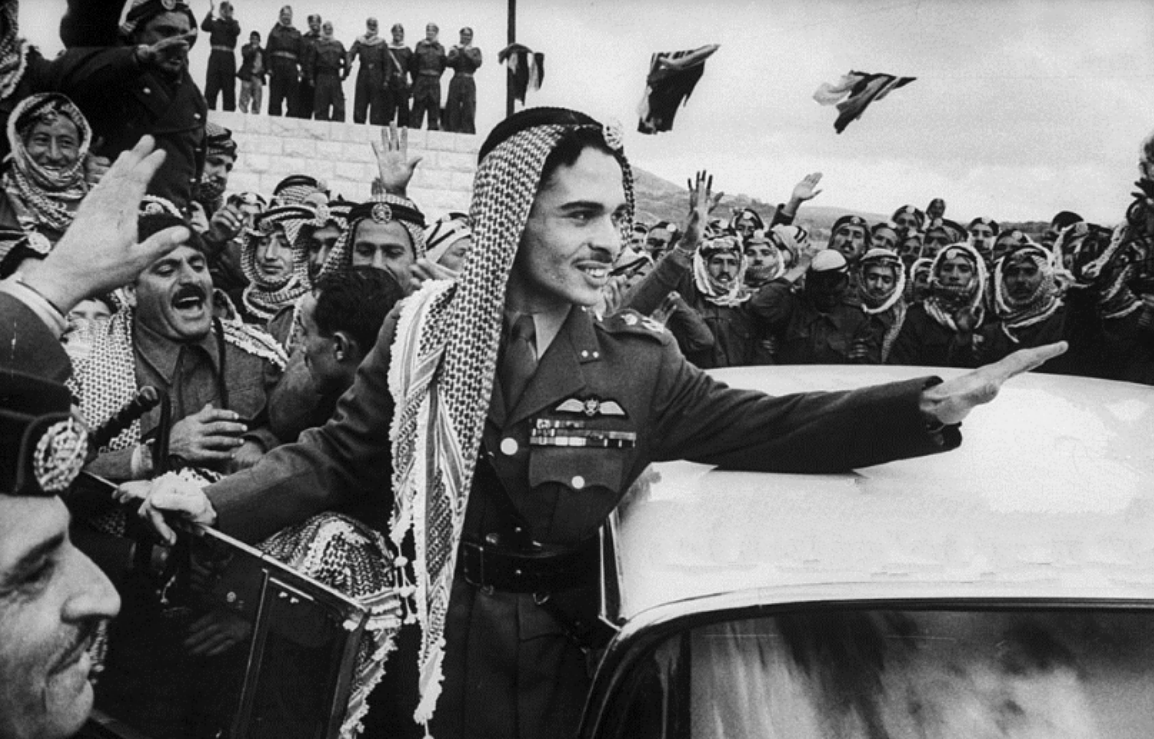
Hussein receiving a warm welcome from his troops, 1 March 1957

On 13 April, rioting broke in the Zarqa army barracks and the 21-year-old Hussein went to end the violence between royalist and Arab nationalist army units after the latter group spread rumors that the King had been assassinated. A 3,000-man Syrian force started moving south towards the Jordanian border in support of what they perceived as a coup attempt, but turned around after the army units showed their loyalty to the King. Two principal accounts emerged regarding the events at Zarqa, with the royalist version holding that the incident was an abortive coup by army chief of staff Ali Abu Nuwar against King Hussein, and the dissident version asserting that it was a staged, American-backed counter-coup by Hussein against the pan-Arabist movement in Jordan. In either case, Abu Nuwar and other senior Arabist officers resigned and were allowed to leave Jordan for Syria, where they incited opposition to the Jordanian monarchy. Hussein reacted by imposing martial law. Although he eventually relaxed some of these measures, namely military curfews and severe press censorship, Hussein's moves significantly curtailed the constitutional democracy that existed in Jordan in the mid-1950s. The alleged conspirators were sentenced to 15 years in absentia, but later on were pardoned by Hussein in 1964 as part of his reconciliation efforts with his exiled opposition, and were entrusted with senior positions in the government.

=== Arab Federation between Iraq and Jordan ===
The 1950s became known as the Arab Cold War, due to the conflict between states led by Nasserist Egypt and traditionalist kingdoms led by Saudi Arabia. Egypt and Syria formed the United Arab Republic (UAR) on 1 February 1958, with the Republic's presidency occupied by Nasser. As a counterweight, Hussein and his cousin, King Faisal II of Hashemite Iraq, established the Arab Federation on 14 February 1958 in an Amman ceremony. The two rival entities launched propaganda wars against each other through their radio broadcasts. Jordanian and Syrian forces clashed in March along the border. UAR-inspired conspiracies started to emerge against the Hashemite federation. An officer in Jordan was arrested for plotting to assassinate Hussein. It also emerged in Jordan that the UAR was planning to overthrow both Hashemite monarchies in July 1958. Jordan reacted by arresting 40 suspected army officers, and Hussein called in Iraqi army chief of staff Rafiq Aref to brief him on the exposed plot. Aref replied, "You look after yourselves. Iraq is a very stable country, unlike Jordan. If there are any worries it is Jordan that should be worried." Although Faisal and Hussein enjoyed a very close relationship, Faisal's Iraqi entourage looked down on Jordan; Hussein attributed this attitude to Iraqi crown prince 'Abd al-Ilah's influence.

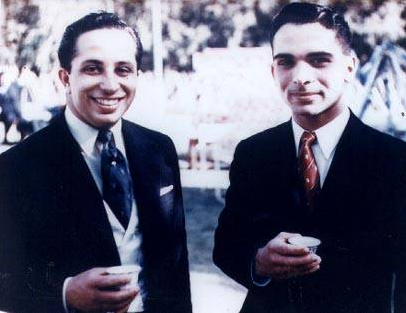
Hussein with his cousin King Faisal II (left) of the Kingdom of Iraq, 1957. In February 1958, the two Hashemite Kingdoms formed the Arab Federation that lasted until Faisal was deposed in a bloody coup on 14 July 1958.

The Lebanese, pro-Western government of Camille Chamoun was also threatened to be toppled by growing UAR-supported domestic opposition groups. The Iraqis sent a brigade to Jordan on 13 July at Hussein's request. The Iraqi brigade's departure to Jordan gave the conspirators in Iraq, led by Brigadier Abd al-Karim Qasim, the opportunity to strike. On 14 July, an Iraqi unit stormed the royal palace in Iraq, executed all members of the Iraqi royal family, and mutilated the bodies of the crown prince and the Iraqi prime minister of the Arab Federation, Nuri Al-Said. Devastated, Hussein ordered a Jordanian expedition led by Hussein ibn Nasser to reclaim the Iraqi throne, but it was recalled after it was 150-mile (241 km) inside Iraq. Hussein, worried about a similar coup in Jordan, tightened martial law. American troops landed in both Lebanon and Jordan as a show of support for pro-Western regimes in the region against the Nasserist tide. By October, the situation had calmed, and Western troops were recalled.

Hussein went on a vacation to Switzerland on 10 November. As he was flying his own plane over Syria, it was intercepted by two Syrian jets that attempted to attack. Hussein outmaneuvered the Syrians and survived the assassination attempt, landing safely in Amman, where he received a hero's welcome – his popularity in Jordan skyrocketed overnight. Golda Meir, an Israeli politician who would later become prime minister, was reported in 1958 as saying: "We all pray three times a day for King Hussein's safety and success." The Israelis preferred that Hussein remain in power rather than a Nasserist regime. Hussein for his part held secret meetings with Israeli officials, including Meir, seeing the fate, needs, and challenges (e.g. water supply) of Jordan inextricably linked with those of Israel and therefore to be solved with the cooperation of the latter.

In 1959, Hussein embarked on a tour to different countries to consolidate bilateral ties. His visit to the United States gained him many friends in Congress after he spoke openly against Soviet influence in the Middle East, returning with a $50 million aid package. Sadiq Al-Shar'a, an army general who accompanied Hussein to the United States, was found to have been plotting a coup against the monarchy. News of the arrest of the conspiring officers in Jordan coincided with Hussein's visit to the US. Hussein was tipped off to Al-Shar'a's involvement, but did not reveal it until they both landed back in Jordan. Al-Shar'a was tried and received the death penalty; Hussein reduced his sentence to life imprisonment. Four years later, Al-Shar'a was pardoned and appointed director of Jordan's passport office.

=== Assassination attempts ===
Hazza' Majali was appointed by Hussein to form a government; it consisted of loyalists who had persuaded Hussein to launch an offensive against the Iraqi government to restore the Hashemite monarchy. The expedition was cancelled amid British opposition and the weakened state of the Royal Jordanian Air Force. UAR agents assassinated Prime Minister Majali with a bomb planted in his office. Twenty minutes later, another explosion went off; it was intended for Hussein as it was expected he would run to the scene, which he did – he was a few minutes late. Hussein, persuaded by Habis Majali, Hazza's cousin and the army chief of staff, prepared for a retaliation against Syria, whose intelligence service was responsible for the assassination. He prepared three brigades in the north, but the operation was called off after combined pressures from the Americans and the British. Egyptian radios denounced Hussein as the "Judas of the Arabs".

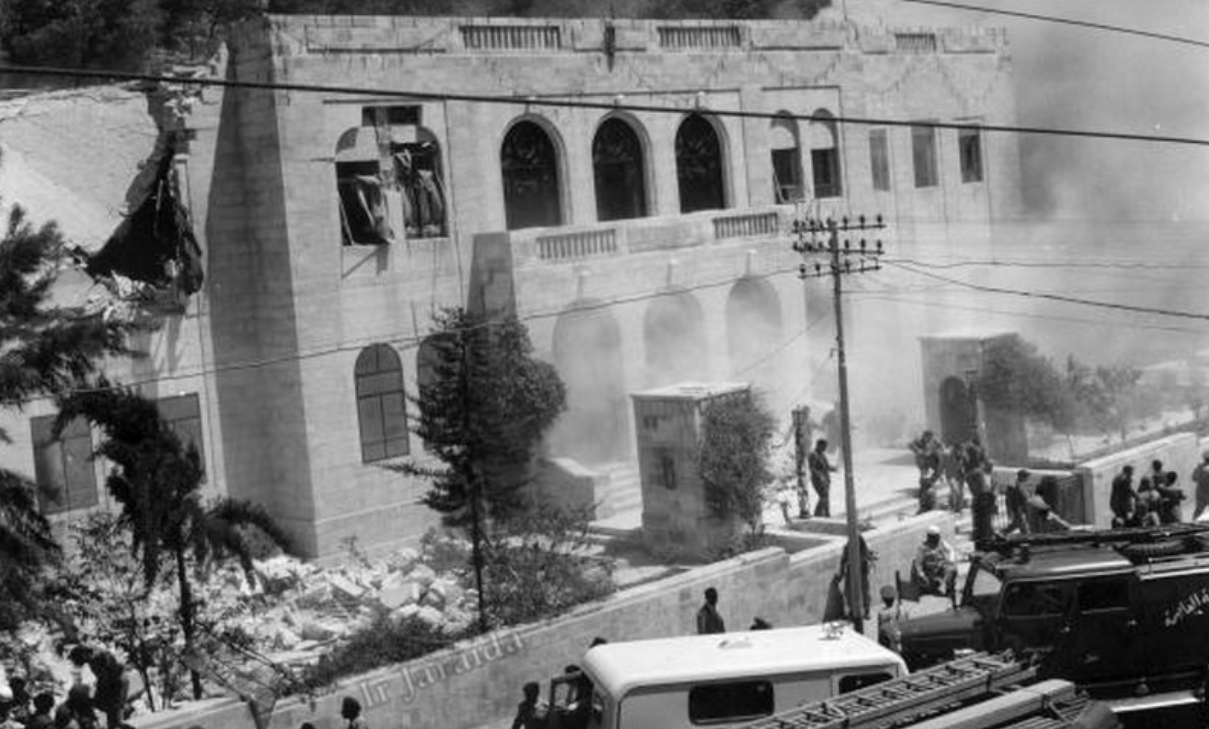
Smoke rising out of the Jordanian Prime Ministry building after the explosion that killed Prime Minister Hazza' Majali on 29 August 1960.

Hussein would be subjected to several more assassination attempts. One involved replacing his nose drops with strong acid. Another plot was uncovered after a large number of cats were found dead in the royal palace; it emerged that the cook had been trying poisons to use against the king. He was later pardoned and released after Hussein received a plea from the cook's daughter. Assassination attempts against the king subsided after a successful coup toppled the Syrian regime on 28 September 1961 and the UAR collapsed. With a calmed situation in Jordan, the King issued his slogan "Let us build this country to serve this nation." But critics considered the slogan mere lip service, saying Hussein showed little interest in the economic situation of the country, unlike the military and foreign relations aspects.

In January 1962 Wasfi Tal was appointed prime minister. The young politician who worked to bring sweeping reforms resigned after Hussein sought to solidify his position following the rise of the Nasser-supporting Ba'ath party to the governments of Iraq and Syria in two 1963 coups. The first direct contacts between Jordan and Israel started in early 1960s; Hussein had a Jewish doctor named Emmanuel Herbert who acted as intermediary between the two nations during Hussein's visits to London. In the talks, Hussein highlighted his commitment to a peaceful resolution to the Israeli–Palestinian conflict. His secret rapprochement with Israel was followed by a public rapprochement with Egyptian president Gamal Abdel Nasser in 1964, which bolstered Hussein's popularity both in Jordan and in the Arab world. Hussein received a warm welcome after visiting West Bank cities afterwards. The rapprochement with Nasser happened during the 1964 Arab League summit in Cairo, where the Palestine Liberation Army (PLA) and the Palestine Liberation Organization (PLO) were established, and where Jordan agreed to join the United Arab Command. During the summit Nasser also attempted to convince Hussein to purchase Soviet weapons, but the Americans provided Hussein with tanks and jets instead, with the understanding that they would not be used in the West Bank at Israel's request. The PLO identified itself as a representative of the Palestinian people, which clashed with Jordan's sovereignty claim over the West Bank. The PLO started to demand that the Jordanian government legalize their activities, including the setting up of Palestinian armed units to fight Israel; the requests were denied.

=== Samu Incident ===
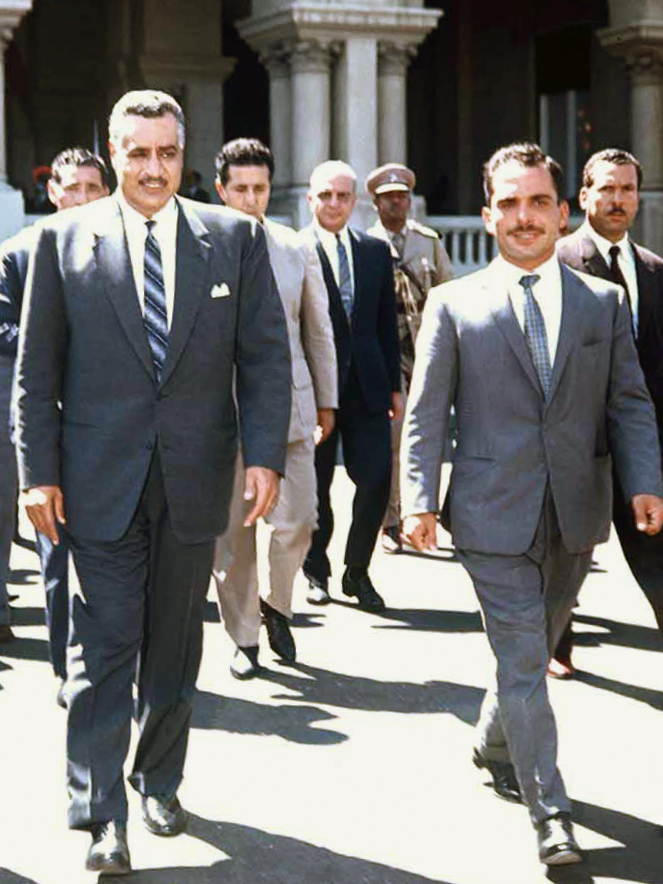
King Hussein and Egyptian president Gamal Abdel Nasser at the 1964 Arab League Summit in Egypt, 11 September 1964

Hussein later stated that during one of his meetings with Israeli representatives: "I told them I could not absorb a serious retaliatory raid, and they accepted the logic of this and promised there would never be one." The Palestinian nationalist organization Fatah started organizing cross-border attacks against Israel in January 1965, often drawing Israeli reprisals on Jordan. One such reprisal was the Samu Incident, an attack launched by Israel on 13 November 1966 on the Jordanian-controlled West Bank town of As-Samu after three Israeli soldiers were killed by a Fatah landmine. The assault inflicted heavy Arab casualties. Israeli writer Avi Shlaim argues that Israel's disproportionate retaliation exacted revenge on the wrong party, as Israeli leaders knew from their coordination with Hussein that he was doing everything he could to prevent such attacks. The incident drew fierce local criticism of Hussein amid feelings he had been betrayed by the Israelis; Hussein also suspected that Israel had changed its attitude towards Jordan and had intended to escalate matters in order to capture the West Bank. Yitzhak Rabin, the then Israel Defense Forces chief of staff, later admitted the disproportionate reaction by Israel, and that the operation would have been better directed at Syria, which was supporting such attacks: "We had neither political nor military reasons to arrive at a confrontation with Jordan or to humiliate Hussein."

The events at Samu triggered large-scale anti-Hashemite protests in the West Bank for what they perceived as Hussein's incompetency for defending them against Israel: rioters attacked government offices, chanted pro-Nasser slogans, and called on Hussein to have the same fate as Nuri As-Said – the Iraqi prime minister who had been killed and mutilated in 1958 along with the Iraqi royal family. Jordanians believed that after this incident, Israel would march on the West Bank whether or not Jordan joined the war. Perception of King Hussein's efforts to come to peaceful terms with Israel led to great dissatisfaction among some Arab leaders. President Nasser of Egypt denounced Hussein as an "imperialist lackey".

If we look at water, it was a problem that both of us suffered from. If we look at even a flu epidemic, it affected both of us. Every aspect of life was interrelated and interlinked in some way or another. And to simply ignore that was something I could not understand. Maybe others could, others who were distant, who were not equally aware or involved. By now there were Palestinians and Jordanians, and their rights, their future was at stake. One had to do something; one had to explore what was possible and what was not.

— Hussein recounting his secret meetings with Israeli representatives

In a meeting with American officials, Hussein, sometimes with tears in his eyes, said: "The growing split between the East Bank and the West Bank has ruined my dreams," and, "There is near despair in the army and the army no longer has confidence in me." Hussein travelled to Cairo on 30 May 1967 and hastily signed an Egyptian-Jordanian mutual defense treaty, returning home to cheering crowds. Shlaim argues that Hussein had possessed options, but had made two mistakes: the first was in putting the Jordanian army under Egyptian command; the second was in allowing the entry of Iraqi troops into Jordan, which raised Israeli suspicions against Jordan. Egyptian general Abdul Munim Riad arrived in Jordan to command its army pursuant to the pact signed with Egypt.

=== Six-Day War ===
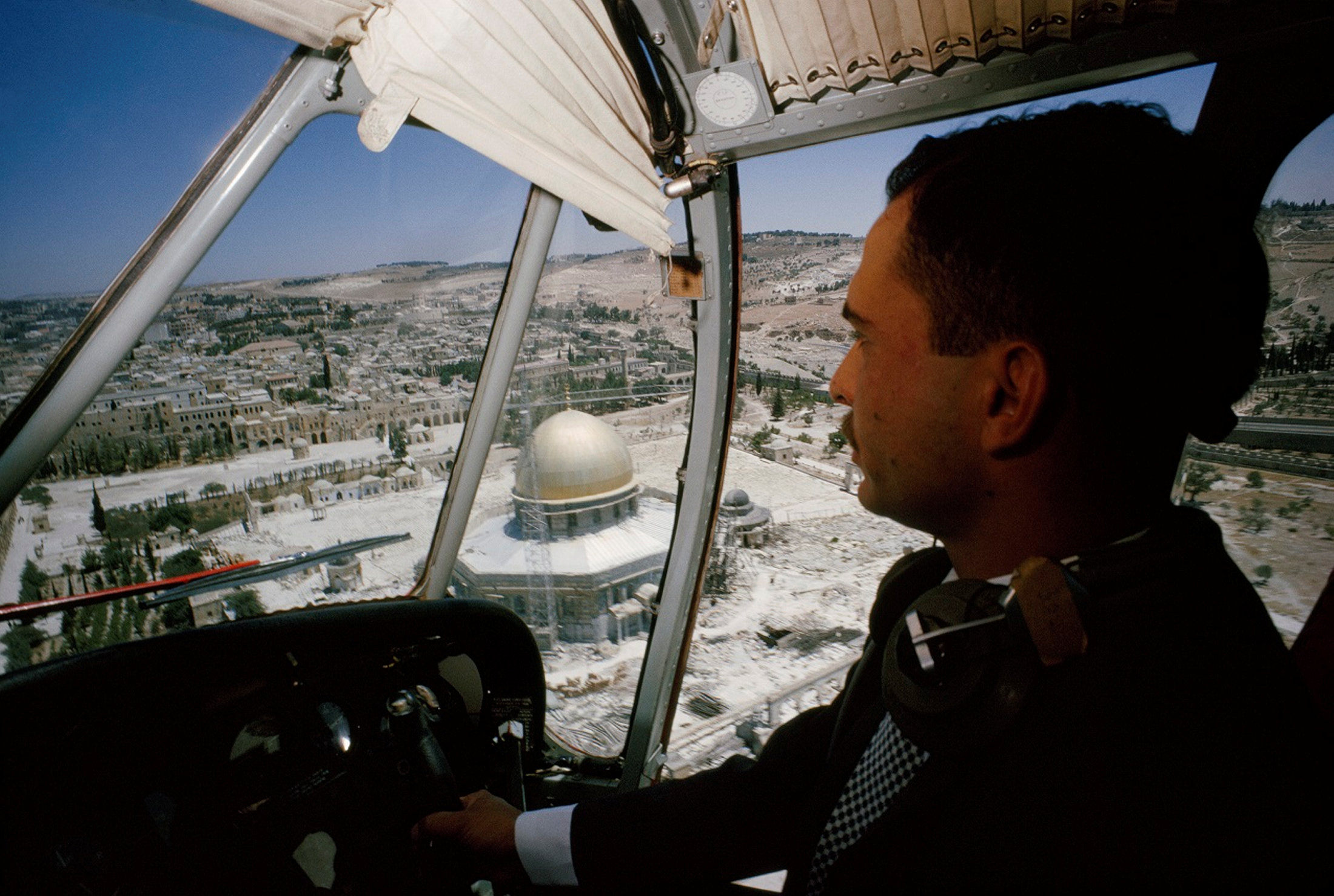
Hussein flying over the Dome of the Rock in East Jerusalem when the West Bank was under Jordanian control, 1964

On 5 June 1967 the Six-Day War began after an Israeli strike wiped out Egypt's Air Force. The Egyptian army commander in Cairo transmitted to General Riad that the Israeli strike had failed, and that Israel's Air Force was almost wiped out. Based on the misleading information from Cairo, Riad ordered the Jordanian army to take offensive positions and attack Israeli targets around Jerusalem. Jordanian Hawker Hunters made sorties but were destroyed by Israel when they went to refuel; Syria's and Iraq's air forces followed. Israel's air superiority on the first day of war proved decisive. Two Israeli jets attempted to assassinate Hussein; one was shot down by anti-aircraft artillery, and the other shot directly at Hussein's office in the royal palace. Hussein was not there, the CIA station chief in Amman Jack O'Connell relayed a message threatening the Israelis, and the attempts stopped. The Jordanians had prepared a war strategy, but the Egyptian commander insisted to build his strategy based on the misleading information from Egypt.

By 7 June fighting led the Jordanians to withdraw from the West Bank, and Jerusalem's Old City and the Dome of the Rock were abandoned after desperate fighting. Israel blew up the bridges between the two banks to consolidate its control. Jordan suffered a severe setback with the loss of the West Bank, which contributed 40% to Jordan's GDP in the tourism, industrial, and agricultural sectors. Around 200,000 Palestinian refugees fled to Jordan, destabilizing Jordan's demographics. The loss of Jerusalem was critical to Jordan, and specifically for Hussein who held the Hashemite custodianship of Muslim and Christian holy sites in Jerusalem. Al-Aqsa mosque is the third holiest site in Islam, believed to be where Muhammad ascended to heaven. By 11 June Israel had decisively won the war by capturing the West Bank from Jordan, the Sinai, including Gaza from Egypt, and the Golan Heights from Syria. Nasser and Hussein, recognizing their defeat, sought to work together towards a more moderate stance.

On 22 November 1967 the United Nations Security Council unanimously approved resolution 242, which became one of Jordan's foreign policy cornerstones. It denounced acquisition of territory by force and called on Israel to withdraw from territories occupied in the 1967 war. Israel rejected the resolution. Hussein restarted talks with Israeli representatives throughout 1968 and 1969, but the talks went nowhere – Shlaim claims the Israelis stalled and that Hussein refused to cede any West Bank territory.

=== Black September ===
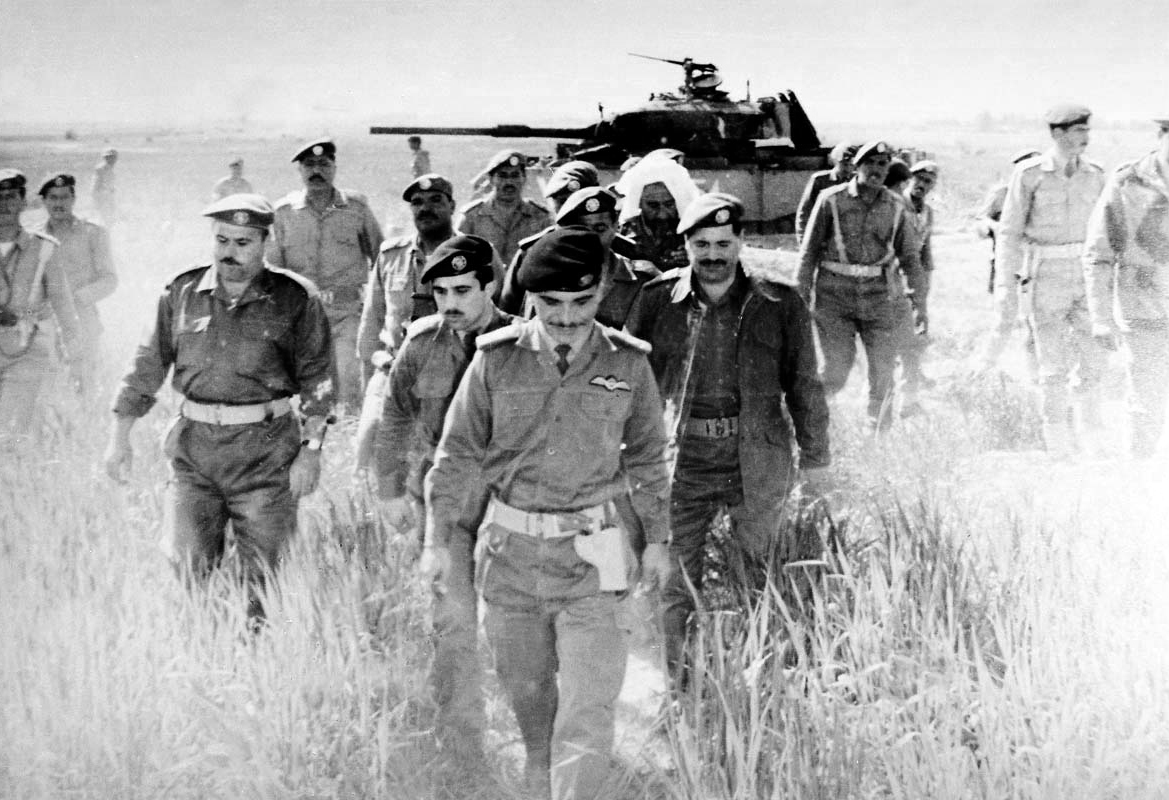
Hussein after checking an abandoned Israeli tank in the aftermath of the Battle of Karameh, 21 March 1968.

After Jordan lost control of the West Bank in 1967, Palestinian fighters known as "fedayeen", meaning self-sacrificers, moved their bases to Jordan and stepped up their attacks on Israel. One Israeli retaliation on a PLO camp based in Karameh, a Jordanian town along the border with the West Bank, developed into a full-scale battle. Some believe that Israel wanted to punish Jordan for its support for the PLO. After failing to capture Yasser Arafat, the PLO leader, Israeli forces withdrew, but not before destroying the Karameh camp and sustaining unwanted casualties.

The perceived joint Jordanian-Palestinian victory in the 1968 Battle of Karameh led to an upsurge of support in the Arab World for Palestinian fighters in Jordan. The PLO in Jordan grew in strength, and by the beginning of 1970 the fedayeen groups started to openly call for the overthrow of the Hashemite monarchy. Acting as a state within a state, the fedayeen disregarded local laws and regulations, and even attempted to assassinate King Hussein twice, leading to violent confrontations between them and the Jordanian army. Hussein wanted to oust the fedayeen from the country, but hesitated to strike because he did not want his enemies to use it against him by equating Palestinian fighters with civilians. PLO actions in Jordan culminated in the Dawson's Field hijackings incident on 10 September 1970, in which the fedayeen hijacked three civilian aircraft and forced their landing in Zarqa, taking foreign nationals as hostages, and later bombing the planes in front of the international press. Hussein saw this as the last straw, and ordered the army to move.

On 17 September the Jordanian army surrounded cities that had a PLO presence, including Amman and Irbid, and began shelling the fedayeen, who had established themselves in Palestinian refugee camps. The next day, a force from Syria with PLO markings started advancing towards Irbid, which the fedayeen declared a "liberated" city. On 22 September, the Syrians withdrew after the Jordanian army launched an air-ground offensive that inflicted heavy Syrian losses, and after Israeli Air Force jets flew over Syrian units in a symbolic show of support of Hussein, but did not engage. An agreement brokered by Egyptian president Nasser between Arafat and Hussein led to an end to the fighting on 27 September. Nasser died the following day of a heart attack. On 13 October Hussein signed an agreement with Arafat to regulate the fedayeen's presence, but the Jordanian army was forced to attack again in January 1971. The fedayeen were driven out of Jordanian cities one by one until 2,000 fedayeen surrendered after being encircled in a forest near Ajloun on 17 July, marking the end of the conflict.

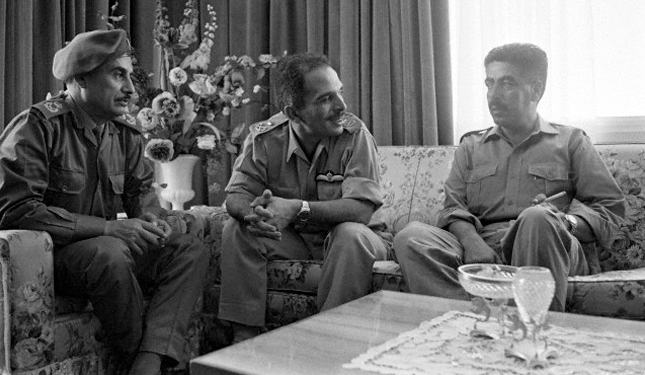
Hussein in a meeting during Black September with Prime Minister Wasfi Tal (right) and Army Chief of Staff Habis Majali (left), 17 September 1970

Jordan allowed the fedayeen to leave for Lebanon through Syria, an event that led to the Lebanese Civil War in 1975. The Black September Organization was founded the same year, named after the conflict. The organization claimed responsibility for the assassination of Jordanian prime minister Wasfi Tal in 1971, and the highly publicized 1972 Munich massacre of innocent civilian Israeli athletes.

In a speech to the Jordanian parliament on 15 March 1972, Hussein announced his "United Arab Kingdom" plan. Unlike the unitary state that had existed between the West Bank and Jordan during Jordan's annexation of the West Bank (1950–1967), this plan envisaged two federal entities on each bank of the Jordan River. According to the proposal, the two districts of the federation would be autonomous, excluding the military and the foreign and security affairs that would be determined by an Amman central government but the plan's implementation was to be conditional upon achieving a peace agreement between Israel and Jordan. Ultimately, Hussein's proposal was ruled out after it was vehemently rejected by Israel, the PLO, and several Arab states.

=== Yom Kippur War ===
After the 1967 war, Gunnar Jarring was appointed by the UN as a special envoy for the Middle East peace process, leading the Jarring Mission. The talks between Arab countries and Israel resulted in a deadlock. The stalemate led to renewed fears of another war between Arab countries and Israel. Worried that Jordan would be dragged into another war unprepared, Hussein sent Zaid Al-Rifai to Egyptian president Anwar Sadat in December 1972 to inquire. Sadat informed Al-Rifai that he had been planning a limited incursion in the Sinai that would allow some political maneuvering. Sadat then invited Al-Rifai and Hussein to a summit on 10 September 1973 with him and Hafez al-Assad, who had become president of Syria. The summit ended with a restoration of ties between Syria, Egypt, and Jordan. Sadat disclosed to Assad and Hussein his intention to initiate military action. Hussein refused Sadat's request to allow the fedayeen's return to Jordan but agreed that in case of a military operation, Jordanian troops would play a limited defensive role in assisting the Syrians in the Golan Heights.

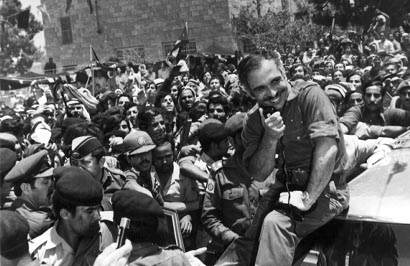
Hussein addressing crowds in Mafraq through his car's megaphone, 12 July 1974

Syria and Egypt launched the Yom Kippur War against Israel in the Sinai and in the Golan Heights on 6 October 1973 without Hussein's knowledge. Between 10 September and 6 October, Hussein secretly met with Israeli prime minister Golda Meir in Tel Aviv on 25 September. Israeli leaks of the meeting led to rumors in the Arab World that Hussein had tipped off Meir about Arab intentions. Hussein only discussed with Meir what both already knew, that the Syrian army was on alert. On 13 October Jordan joined the war and sent the 40th brigade to assist the Syrians in the Golan Heights. Some saw it as ironic that it was the same brigade that had been sent to deter the Syrian invasion during Black September in 1970. Subsequent peace talks with Israel collapsed; while Jordan wanted a complete Israeli withdrawal from the West Bank, Israel preferred to retain control but with Jordanian administration.

In the 1974 Arab League summit held in Morocco on 26 October, a Fatah plot to assassinate Hussein upon his arrival was uncovered by the Moroccan authorities. The plot did not deter Hussein from joining the summit, but at the end Jordan was forced to join all the Arab countries in recognizing the PLO as "the sole representative of the Palestinian people," a diplomatic defeat for Hussein. The relationship between Jordan and the United States deteriorated when Jordan refused to join the Camp David Accords. The Accords formed the peace treaty between Egypt and Israel, due in large part to the agreement of Israel to withdraw from the Sinai, while being forced to keep the Gaza Strip, which Egypt did not want to manage.In 1978 Hussein went to Baghdad for the first time since 1958; there, he met Iraqi politician Saddam Hussein. When Saddam became president of Iraq in 1979, Hussein supported Saddam's Iran–Iraq War that stretched from 1980 to 1988. The relationship grew as Saddam provided Jordan with subsidized oil, and Jordan allowed Iraq to use the Port of Aqaba for its exports.

=== Involvement in peace initiatives ===
When the PLO moved to Lebanon from Jordan after 1970, repeated attacks and counter-attacks occurred in southern Lebanon between the PLO and Israel. Two major Israeli incursions into Lebanon occurred in 1978, and the other in 1982, the latter conflict troubled Hussein as the IDF had laid siege to Beirut. The PLO was to be expelled from Lebanon, and Ariel Sharon, the Israeli Defense minister, suggested they be moved to Jordan where the monarchy would be toppled and Jordan would serve as an "alternative Palestinian homeland". Sharon boasted: "One speech by me will make King Hussein realize that the time has come to pack his bags." However, Arafat rejected Sharon's suggestion, and the fedayeen were transported to Tunisia under American cover.

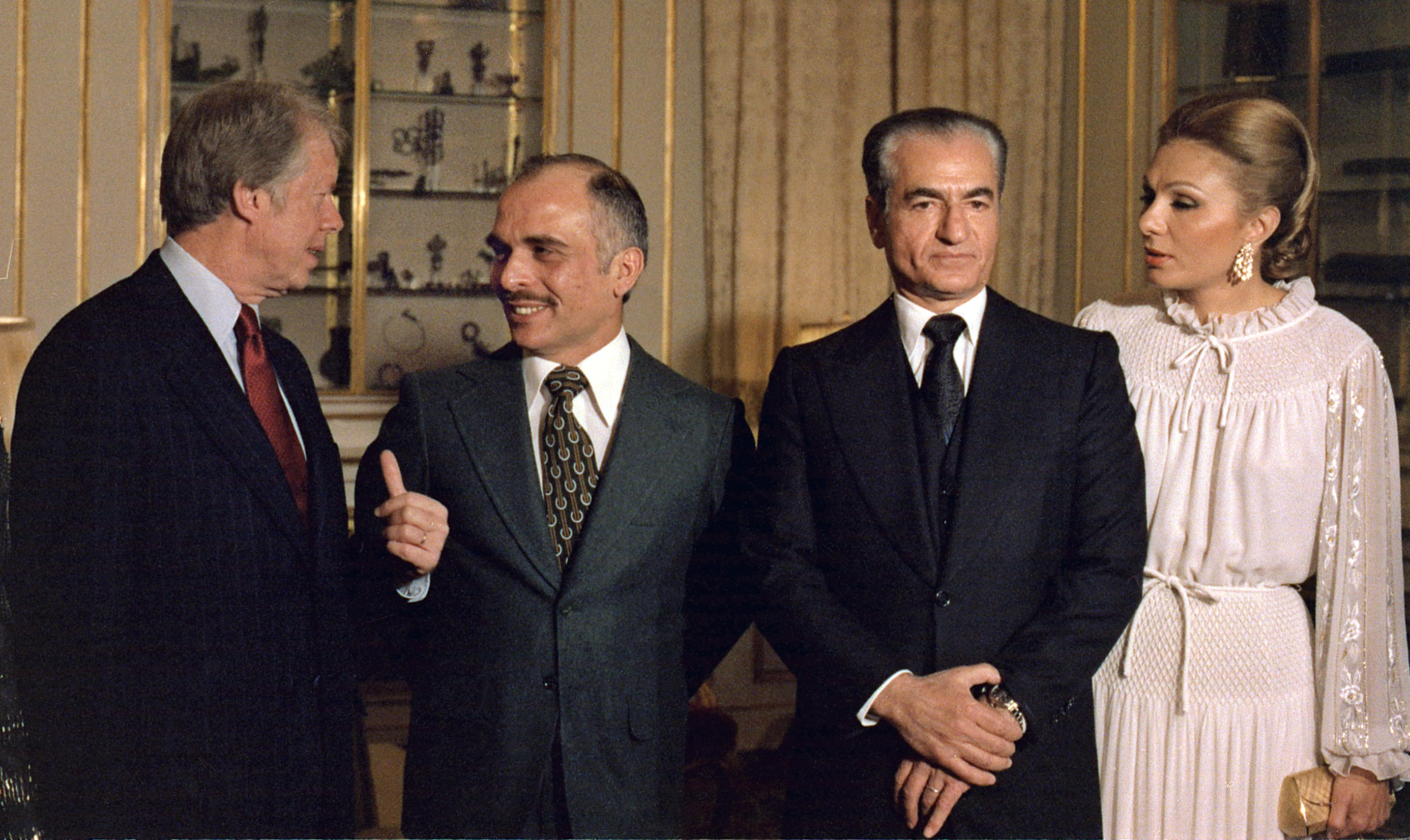
Hussein with American president Jimmy Carter, Iranian Shah Mohammad Reza Pahlavi and Shahbanou Farah (from left to right), 31 December 1977

In 1983, American president Ronald Reagan suggested a peace plan that became known as the Reagan plan, similar to Hussein's 1972 federation plan. Hussein and Arafat both agreed to the plan on 1 April, but the PLO's executive office rejected it. A year and a half later, a renewed effort by Hussein to jump start the peace process culminated in the establishment of a Jordan–PLO accord that sought a peaceful resolution to the Israeli-Palestinian conflict, an unprecedented milestone for the PLO and a Jordanian diplomatic victory. The accord was opposed by Israel and garnered no international support from either the United States or the Soviet Union. Around the same time, Hussein met Israel prime minister Shimon Peres on 19 July 1985 in the United Kingdom, where Peres assented to the accord, but later the rest of his government opposed it due to the PLO's involvement. Subsequent talks between the PLO and Jordan collapsed after the PLO refused to make concessions; in a speech Hussein announced that "after two long attempts, I and the government of Jordan hereby announce that we are unable to continue to coordinate politically with the PLO leadership until such time as their word becomes their bond, characterized by commitment, credibility and constancy."

Jordan started a crackdown on the PLO by closing their offices in Amman after the Israeli minister of defense, Yitzhak Rabin, requested it from Hussein in a secret meeting. Jordan announced a $1.3 billion five-year development plan for the West Bank, in a bid to enhance its image in the West Bank residents at the expense of the PLO. Around the same time, Hussein became troubled after he heard that Israel had been selling American weapons to Iran, thereby lengthening the conflict between Iraq and Iran, both supporters of the PLO. The relationship between Hussein and Saddam became very close – Hussein visited Baghdad 61 times between 1980 and 1990, and Saddam used Hussein to relay messages to several countries, including the US and Britain. In June 1982, after Iran's victory seemed imminent, Hussein personally carried to Saddam sensitive photographic intelligence forwarded to him by the US. In return, Saddam provided incentives for Jordanian exports to Iraq, which accounted for a quarter of all Jordan's exports, valued at $212.3 million in 1989. Iraqi aid helped Jordan's finances; Hussein had felt it humiliating to keep asking Gulf countries for assistance. Hussein made a little-known attempt to heal the rift between the two Ba'ath regimes of Iraq and Syria in April 1986. The meeting between Hafez al-Assad and Saddam Hussein occurred at an airbase in Al-Jafr in the eastern Jordanian desert. The talks lasted for a day, after which no progress was made. Saddam was angry at Al-Assad for supporting Iran against an Arab country, Iraq, which Al-Assad was unapologetic for, and Al-Assad was adamant about establishing a union between Iraq and Syria, which Saddam rejected.

On 11 April 1987, after Yitzhak Shamir became prime minister of Israel, Hussein engaged in direct talks with Shamir's foreign minister, Peres, in London. After reaching an agreement between Hussein and Peres on establishing an international peace conference, Shamir and the rest of the ministers in his cabinet rejected the proposal. On 8 November 1987 Jordan hosted an Arab League summit; Hussein enjoyed good relations with rival Arab blocs, and he acted as conciliatory intermediate. He helped mobilize Arab support for Iraq against Iran, and for Jordan's peace efforts, and helped to end the decade-long Arab boycott of Egypt – a boycott that began after it unilaterally signed a peace treaty with Israel in 1979. Hussein described the summit as one of the best moments in his life. In the summer of 1993 Hussein opened Challenge 93, the First International Ex-Service Wheechair Games, organised by The Royal British Legion, at Stoke Mandeville and led the reconcilliation on the sportsfield of former combattants on the battlefield.

=== Disengagement from West Bank ===
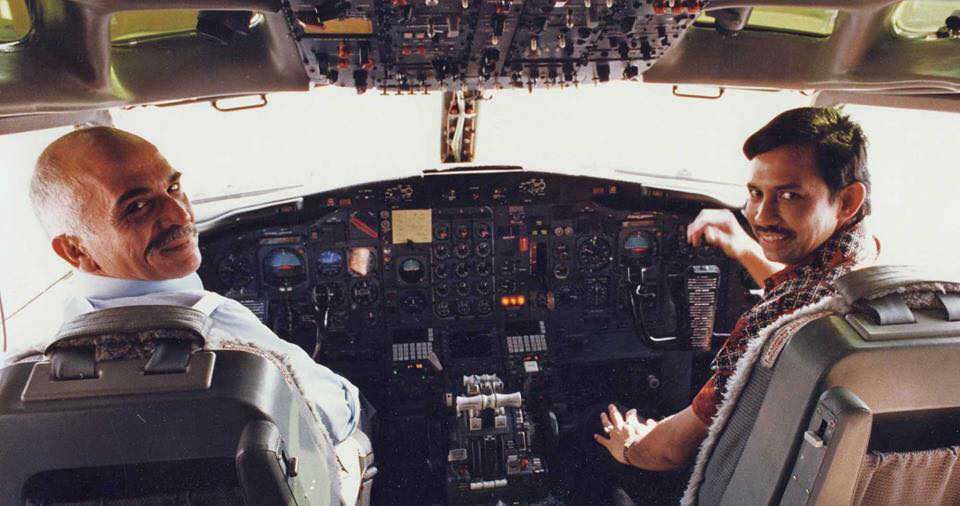
Hussein flying an airplane with Brunei Sultan Hassanal Bolkiah, 1984

On 9 December 1987 an Israeli truck driver ran over four Palestinians in a Gaza refugee camp, sparking unrest that spread to violent demonstrations in the West Bank. What began as an uprising to achieve Palestinian independence against the Israeli occupation turned into an upsurge of support for the PLO, which had orchestrated the uprising, and consequently diminished Jordanian influence in the West Bank. Jordanian policy on the West Bank had to be reconsidered following renewed fears that Israel would revive its proposal for Jordan to become an "alternative Palestinian homeland". US Secretary of State George P. Shultz set up a peace process that became known as the Schulz Initiative. It called for Jordan rather than the PLO to represent the Palestinians; however, when Schultz contacted Hussein about the plan, he reversed his position and told him it was a matter for the PLO to decide.

The orchestrators of the Intifada were the Unified National Leadership of the Uprising, which issued its 10th communiqué on 11 March 1988, urging its followers to "intensify the mass pressure against the [Israel] occupation army and the settlers and against collaborators and personnel of the Jordanian regime." West Bank Palestinians deviation from the Jordanian state highlighted the need for a revision in Jordan's policy, and Jordanian nationalists began to argue that Jordan would be better off without the Palestinians and without the West Bank. Adnan Abu Oudeh, a Palestinian descendant who was Hussein's political advisor, Prime Minister Zaid Al-Rifai, army chief of staff Zaid ibn Shaker, Royal Court chief Marwan Kasim, and mukhabarat director Tariq Alaeddin, helped the King prepare West Bank disengagement plans. The Jordanian Ministry of Occupied Territories Affairs was abolished on 1 July 1988, its responsibilities taken over by the Palestinian Affairs Department. On 28 July Jordan terminated the West Bank development plan. Two days later a royal decree dissolved the House of Representatives, thereby removing West Bank representation in the Parliament. In a televised speech on 1 August, Hussein announced the "severing of Jordan's legal and administrative ties with the West Bank," essentially surrendering claims of sovereignty over the West Bank. The move revoked the Jordanian citizenship of Palestinians in the West Bank (who had obtained it since Jordan annexed the territory in 1950), but not that of Palestinians residing in Jordan. Nevertheless, the Hashemite custodianship over the Muslim and Christian holy sites in Jerusalem was retained. Israeli politicians were stunned, thinking it was a political manoeuvre so that the Palestinians could show support for Hussein, but later realized that it represented a shift in Jordan's policy after Hussein asked his West Bank supporters not to issue petitions demanding that he relent. In a meeting in November 1988 the PLO accepted all United Nations resolutions and agreed to recognize Israel.

=== 1989 riots ===
Jordan's disengagement from the West Bank led to a slowing of the Jordanian economy. The Jordanian dinar lost a third of its value in 1988, and Jordan's foreign debt reached a figure double that of its gross national product (GNP). Jordan introduced austerity measures to combat the economic crisis. On 16 April 1989 the government increased prices of gasoline, licensing fees, alcoholic beverages, and cigarettes, between 15% and 50%, in a bid to increase revenues in accordance with an agreement with the International Monetary Fund (IMF). The IMF agreement was to enable Jordan to reschedule its $6 billion debt, and obtain loans totaling $275 million over 18 months. On 18 April riots in Ma'an spread to other southern towns such as Al-Karak and Tafila, where The New York Times reported that around 4,000 people gathered in the streets and clashed with the police, resulting in six protesters killed and 42 injured, and two policemen killed and 47 injured.

Despite the fact that the protests were triggered by a troubling economic situation, the crowds' demands became political. Protesters accused Zaid Al-Rifai's government of rampant corruption and demanded that the martial law in place since 1957 be lifted and parliamentary elections be resumed. The last parliamentary election had taken place in 1967, just before Jordan lost the West Bank, and when the parliament's tenure ended in 1971, no elections could be held due to the fact that the West Bank was under Israeli occupation, but the West Bank's status became irrelevant after Jordan's disengagement in 1988. Hussein relented to the demands by dismissing Al-Rifai, and appointed Zaid ibn Shaker to form a new government. In 1986 a new electoral law was passed, which allowed the reintroduction of parliamentary elections to proceed smoothly. The cabinet passed amendments to the electoral law that removed articles dealing with West Bank representation. In May 1989, just before the elections, Hussein announced his intention to appoint a 60-person royal commission to draft a reformist document named the National Charter. The National Charter sought to set a timetable for democratization acts. Although most members of the commission were regime loyalists, it included a number of opposition figures and dissidents. Parliamentary elections were held on 8 November 1989, the first in 22 years. The National Charter was drafted and ratified by parliament in 1991.

=== Gulf War ===
A UN-brokered ceasefire became active in July 1988, ending the Iran-Iraq war. Hussein had advised Saddam after 1988 to polish his image in the West by visiting other countries, and by appearing at the United Nations for a speech, but to no avail. The Iraqi-Jordanian relationship developed into the Arab Cooperation Council (ACC), which also included Egypt and North Yemen, on 16 February 1989, serving as a counter to the Gulf Cooperation Council.

Saddam's invasion of Kuwait on 2 August 1990 led six months later to international intervention to expel Iraqi forces from Kuwait in what became known as the Gulf War. Iraq's invasion of Kuwait caught Hussein by surprise; he was the ACC chairman at that time, and a personal friend of Saddam's. After informing the American president George H. W. Bush of his intention to travel to Baghdad to contain the situation, Hussein travelled to Baghdad on 3 August for a meeting with Saddam; at the meeting, the latter announced his intention to withdraw Iraqi troops from Kuwait only if Arab governments refrained from issuing statements of condemnation, and no foreign troops were involved. On Hussein's way back from Baghdad, Egypt issued a condemnation of the Iraqi invasion. To Hussein's dismay, Egyptian president Husni Mubarak refused to reverse his position and called for Iraq's unconditional withdrawal from Kuwait. An Arab League summit held in Cairo issued a condemnation of Iraq with a fourteen-vote majority, despite calls by Jordan's foreign minister Marwan Al-Kasim that this move would hinder Hussein's efforts to reach a peaceful resolution. Both Kuwait and Saudi Arabia viewed Hussein with suspicion – they distrusted him and believed he was planning to obtain a share of Kuwait's wealth.

On 6 August American troops arrived at the Kuwait-Saudi Arabian border, Saddam's conditions were ignored, and Hussein's role as mediator was undermined. Saddam then announced that his invasion had become "irreversible", and on 8 August he annexed Kuwait. Jordan, along with the international community, refused to recognize the Iraqi-installed regime in Kuwait. The United States, seeing Jordan's neutrality as siding with Saddam, cut its aid to Jordan – aid on which Jordan depended; Gulf countries soon followed. Hussein's position in the international community was severely affected, so severe that he privately discussed his intention to abdicate. Jordan's public opinion was overwhelmingly against international intervention, and against Gulf rulers who were perceived to be greedy and corrupt. Hussein's popularity among Jordanians reached its zenith, and anti-Western demonstrations filled the streets. But Western pundits viewed Hussein's actions as impulsive and emotional, claiming that he could have dampened Jordanian public support for Iraq through better leadership. Hussein's brother, Crown Prince Hassan, also disagreed with Hussein, but the King refused to recognize Saddam's wrongdoings.

In late August and early September Hussein visited twelve Western and Arab capitals in an effort to promote a peaceful resolution. He finished his tour by flying directly to Baghdad to meet Saddam, where he warned: "Make a brave decision and withdraw your forces; if you don't, you will be forced out." Saddam was adamant but agreed to Hussein's request to release Western nationals who were being held as hostages. Threats of a war between Israel and Iraq were rising, and in December 1990 Hussein relayed a message to Saddam saying that Jordan would not tolerate any violations of its territory. Jordan dispatched an armored division to its borders with Iraq, and Hussein's eldest son Abdullah was in charge of a Cobra helicopter squadron. Jordan also concentrated its forces near its border with Israel. Adding to Jordan's deteriorating situation was the arrival of 400,000 Palestinian refugees from Kuwait, who had all been working there. By 28 February 1991 the international coalition had successfully cleared Iraqi forces from Kuwait.

=== Peace with Israel ===
Peace demands no less courage than war. It is the courage to meet the adversary, his attitudes and arguments, the courage to face hardships, the courage to bury senseless illusions, the courage to surmount impeding obstacles, the courage to engage in a dialogue to tear down the walls of fear and suspicion. It is the courage to face reality.

— King Hussein during his address to the Jordanian Parliament in Amman on 12 October 1991

Jordan participated in the imposition of economic sanctions against Iraq even though the sanctions would severely affect its economy. The effects of the Gulf War, the sanctions on Iraq, and the flow of refugees to Jordan were estimated by a UN report to be $1.5 billion out of a gross domestic product (GDP) of $4.2 billion in 1990, and $3.6 billion out of a GDP of $4.7 billion in 1991. The end of the Gulf War coincided with the end of the Cold War. This allowed the United States to play a more active role in solving the decades-long Israeli-Palestinian conflict. The Bush administration were still angry at Hussein for the Gulf War events but realized they needed Jordan's participation in any peace process. Hussein agreed to an American request to join an international peace conference so that Jordan could start repairing its relationship with the United States and end its political isolation. Hussein's moves towards democratization in 1989 and his stance during the 1990 Gulf War had won him considerable popularity across Jordan's political spectrum. But when Hussein replaced his conservative prime minister, Mudar Badran, with liberal Palestinian Taher Al-Masri, who was in favor of peace negotiations with Israel, the Muslim Brotherhood – Jordan's main opposition group, who at that time occupied 22 out of 80 seats in the House of Representatives, and whose members and support came mostly from Palestinians in the country – vehemently rejected the new prime minister by voting against him during the vote of confidence. The Brotherhood also refused to participate in the National Congress where the King hoped to gather support for a peace settlement.

Hussein was tasked by the United States with forming a joint Palestinian-Jordanian delegation to participate in the Madrid Peace Conference. The 28-member delegation consisted of 14 Jordanians and 14 Palestinians. Along with solving the Palestinian problem, Jordan sought to safeguard its interests in relation to security, the economy, water, and the environment. The peace conference convened on 30 October 1991, with delegations representing all parties to the conflict, the United States and the Soviet Union as co-sponsors, and the United Nations as observer. The conference set a framework for negotiations, and PLO representatives offered to accept a Palestinian state under a confederation with Jordan. At home, the Muslim Brotherhood considered Al-Masri and his government as too liberal, and the Brotherhood merged with independent Islamists and formed the Islamic Action Front (IAF), increasing its representation to 34 in the 80-member House of Representative, a force strong enough to bring down the royally appointed government with a motion of a vote of no confidence. Hussein then replaced Al-Masri with his conservative cousin Zaid ibn Shaker. Subsequent peace talks continued in Washington, D.C., stretching from December 1991 to September 1993.

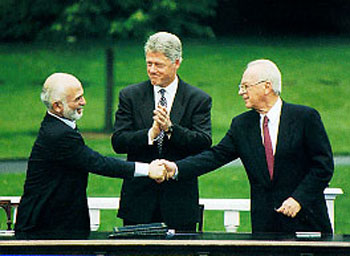
Hussein shakes hands with Israeli prime minister Yitzhak Rabin during the Washington declaration that ended the "state of belligerency" as American president Bill Clinton observes, 13 September 1994.

Hussein could not participate in the details of the talks, a task he handed to his brother Hassan. Hussein was referred to the Mayo Clinic in the United States after having urological problems; he had his left kidney removed after tests showed his ureter contained precancerous cells. When Hussein went back healed to Jordan, he received a hero's welcome – a third of Jordan's population filled the streets to greet him. On 23 November 1992 he gave an unusually aggressive speech. He called on extremists on both the right and left of the political spectrum to end their opposition to the peace negotiations, denounced what he saw as the Gulf countries' undemocratic nature, and called on Saddam to introduce democracy to Iraq. Meanwhile, Yitzhak Rabin, under the leftist Labor Party, emerged as prime minister of Israel. Thus, the PLO and Israeli representatives were quick to reach an agreement, which culminated in the 1993 Oslo Accords. The Accords were held in secrecy between Arafat and Rabin without Hussein's knowledge, completely marginalizing Jordan and the Palestinian-Jordanian delegation in Washington.

The parliamentary elections held on 8 November 1993 were the first multi-party elections since 1956, but the proportional representation voting system was replaced by the controversial one man, one vote system. The latter system was introduced to limit the Islamist opposition's representation in the House of Representatives, by gerrymandering Palestinian majority areas and encouraging independents over partisan candidates. Consequently, the IAF's seats decreased from 34 to 21 seats out of 80. On 25 July 1994 Rabin and Hussein appeared at the White House and signed the Washington declaration, which announced the "end of the state of belligerency". Subsequent negotiations culminated in the Israel–Jordan peace treaty, signed on 26 October in a ceremony in Wadi Araba. The treaty was a culmination of over 58 secret meetings over 31 years between Hussein and Israeli leaders. The treaty recognized Jordan's role in Jerusalem's holy sites, which angered Arafat who had sought such a position. Jordan's relations with the United States greatly improved: $700 million worth of Jordan's debt was forgiven by the United States Congress, and Bill Clinton's administration authorized a substantial flow of aid to Jordan. After 1995 Hussein became increasingly critical of Saddam's rule in Iraq.

On 4 November 1995 the Israeli prime minister Yitzhak Rabin was assassinated by a Jewish extremist, who aimed to undermine Rabin's peace efforts with the Palestinians. Due to the close relationship forged with Rabin during the negotiations of the treaty, Hussein was invited to give a speech during Rabin's funeral in Jerusalem. This was the first time Hussein had been in Jerusalem since the 1967 war. Hussein drew parallels between Rabin's assassination and his grandfather's assassination in 1951: "We are not ashamed, nor are we afraid, nor are we anything but determined to continue the legacy for which my friend fell, as did my grandfather in this city when I was with him and but a boy."

Jordan's signing of a peace treaty with Israel, and other issues, were met with disdain by Syria's president Hafez al-Assad. The CIA handed the King a detailed report in December 1995 warning him of a Syrian plot to assassinate him and his brother Hassan. A month later, the CIA sent Hussein another report warning Jordan of Iraqi plots to attack Western targets in Jordan to undermine Jordan's security due to its support for the Iraqi opposition. In Israel, Shimon Peres of the leftist Labor Party and Benjamin Netanyahu of the right-wing Likud party, were competing for the post of prime minister. Hussein's popularity in Israel had peaked after the peace treaty was signed, and he was expected to express support for a candidate. Hussein initially remained neutral, but later expressed support for Netanyahu. Efraim Halevy, then head of the Israeli intelligence agency (Mossad), claims that Hussein had preferred Netanyahu over Peres as he had deeply mistrusted the latter. The Israeli general election held on 29 May 1996 witnessed Netanyahu's ascension to the prime ministry.

=== Tensions with Israel ===
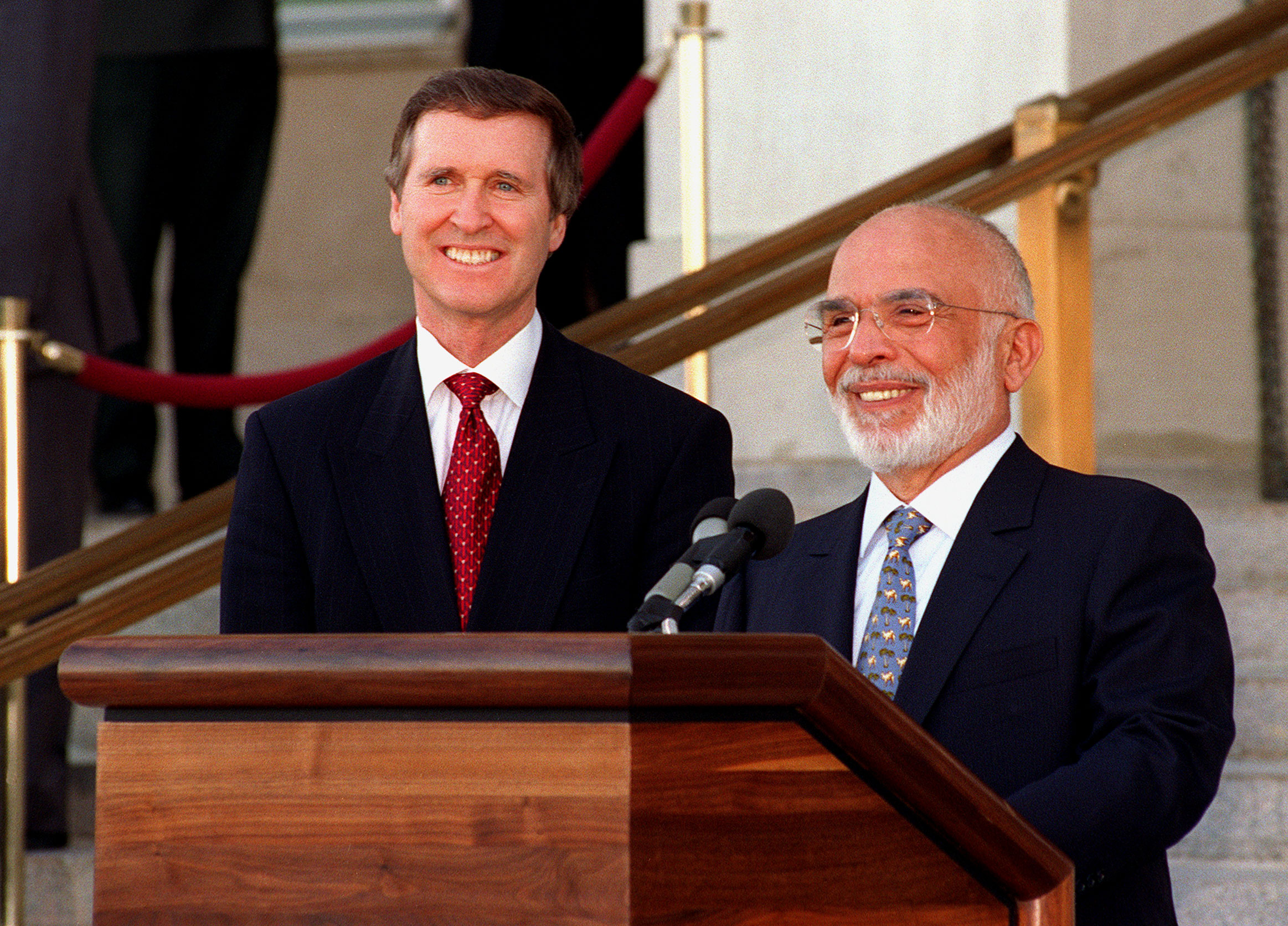
Hussein during a press conference at the White House with American secretary of Defense William Cohen, 2 April 1997

Hussein's support for Netanyahu soon backfired. Israel's actions during the 1996 Qana massacre in Southern Lebanon, the Likud government's decision to build settlements in East Jerusalem, and the events at the Temple Mount where clashes between Palestinian and Israeli police ensued after Israeli tunnel diggings around the Mount, generated an uproar of criticism for Netanyahu in the Arab World. On 9 March 1997 Hussein sent Netanyahu a three-page letter expressing his disappointment. The King lambasted Netanyahu, with the letter's opening sentence stating: "My distress is genuine and deep over the accumulating tragic actions which you have initiated at the head of the Government of Israel, making peace – the worthiest objective of my life – appear more and more like a distant elusive mirage."

Four days later, on 13 March, a Jordanian soldier patrolling the borders between Jordan and Israel in the north near the Island of Peace, killed seven Israeli schoolgirls and wounded six others. The King, who was on an official visit to Spain, returned home immediately. He travelled to the Israeli town of Beit Shemesh to offer his condolences to the grieving families of the Israeli children killed. He went in front of the families, telling them that the incident was "a crime that is a shame for all of us. I feel as if I have lost a child of my own. If there is any purpose in life it will be to make sure that all the children no longer suffer the way our generation did." His gesture was received very warmly in Israel, and Hussein sent the families $1 million in total as compensation for the loss of life. The soldier was determined to be mentally unstable by a Jordanian military tribunal and was sentenced to 20 years in prison, which he served entirely.

Clashes between Israeli forces and Palestinian groups in Gaza and the West Bank surfaced. Hussein's wife, Queen Noor, later claimed her husband was having trouble sleeping: "Everything he had worked for all his life, every relationship he had painstakingly built on trust and respect, every dream of peace and prosperity he had had for Jordan's children, was turning into a nightmare. I really did not know how much more Hussein could take."

On 27 September 1997 eight Mossad agents entered Jordan using fake Canadian passports and attempted to assassinate Jordanian citizen Khaled Mashal, head of the Palestinian group Hamas. Hussein was preparing for a 30-year Hamas-Israel truce three days prior to the attempt, after Hamas had launched two attacks in Jerusalem. Two Mossad agents followed Mashal to his office and injected poison into his ears, but they were caught by Mashal's bodyguard. The two agents were then held by the Jordanian police, while the six other agents hid in the Israeli embassy. Furious, Hussein met with an Israeli delegate who attempted to explain the situation; the King said in a speech about the incident that he felt that somebody "had spat in his face." Jordanian authorities requested Netanyahu to provide an antidote to save Mashal's life, but Netanyahu refused to do so. Jordan then threatened to storm the Israeli embassy and capture the rest of the Mossad team, but Israel argued that it would be against the Geneva Conventions. Jordan replied that the Geneva Conventions "do not apply to terrorists", and a special operations team headed by Hussein's son Abdullah was put in charge of the operation. Hussein called American president Clinton and requested his intervention, threatening to annul the treaty if Israel did not provide the antidote. Clinton later managed to get Israel's approval to reveal the name of the antidote, and complained about Netanyahu: "This man is impossible!" Khaled Mashal recovered, but Jordan's relations with Israel deteriorated and Israeli requests to contact Hussein were rebuffed. The Mossad operatives were released by Jordan after Israel agreed to release 23 Jordanian and 50 Palestinian prisoners including Sheikh Ahmed Yassin.

Mounting opposition in Jordan to the peace treaty with Israel led Hussein to put greater restrictions on freedom of speech. Several dissidents were imprisoned including Laith Shubeilat, a prominent Islamist. A few months into his imprisonment, the King personally gave Shubeilat, his fiercest critic, a ride home from the Swaqa prison. However, the crackdown led the opposition groups in Jordan to boycott the 1997 parliamentary elections. In 1998 Jordan refused a secret request from Netanyahu to attack Iraq using Jordanian airspace after claiming Saddam held weapons of mass destruction.

== Illness, death and funeral ==
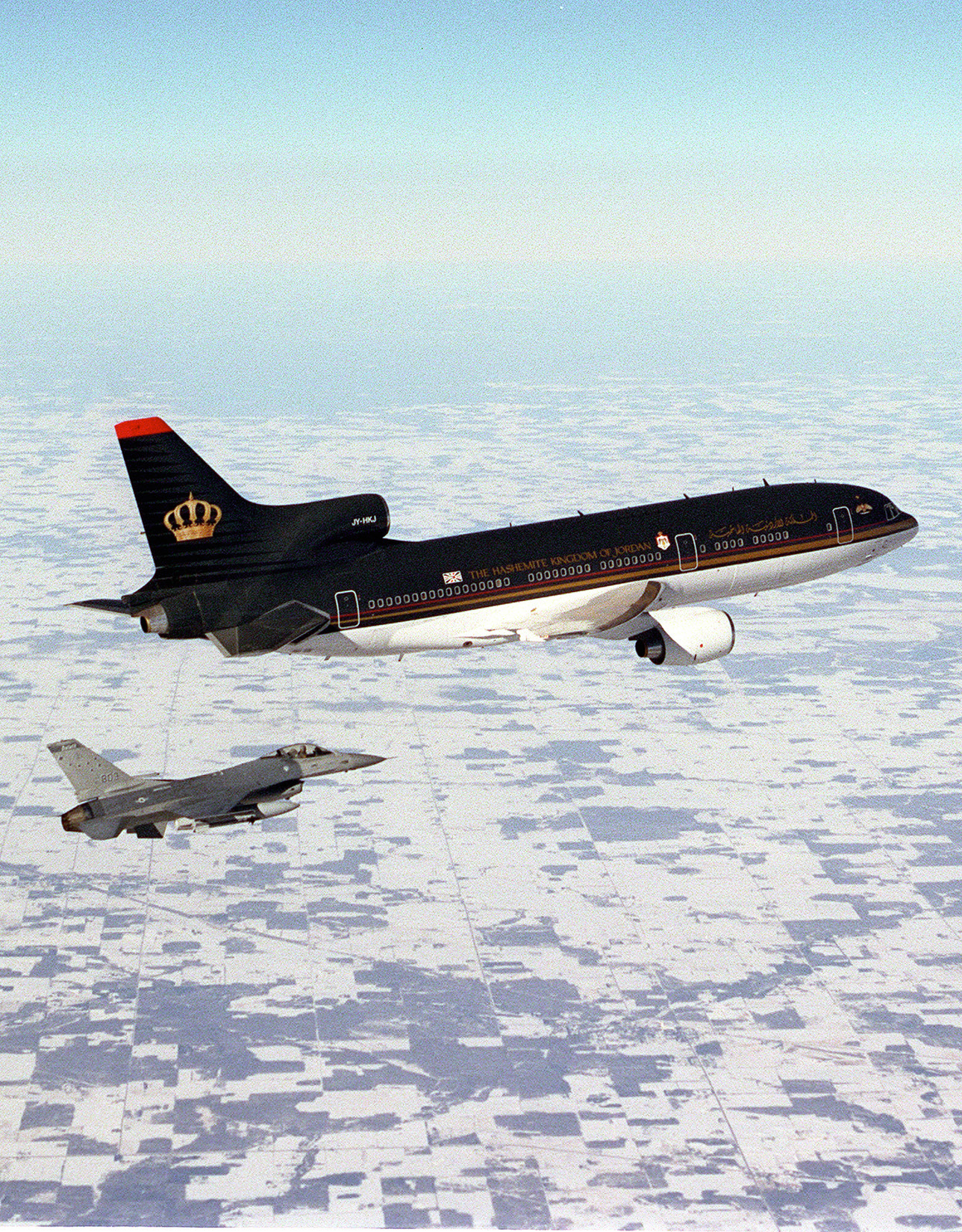
Royal Jordanian 1 is escorted on 4 February 1999 by an F-16 of the Minnesota Air National Guard during King Hussein's return to Jordan. He died 3 days later.

In May 1998, Hussein, a heavy smoker, was admitted to the Mayo Clinic, but doctors were unable to diagnose his ailment. Hussein returned to the clinic in July after suffering severe fevers; doctors then diagnosed him with Non-Hodgkin lymphoma. He stayed in the clinic until the end of 1998, while his brother Hassan, who had been crown prince since 1965, acted as regent. He was given six courses of chemotherapy for his lymph gland cancer over a five-month period. Hussein gained the respect of the Mayo Clinic staff for his warmth and kindness; on one occasion, a janitor cried uncontrollably after Hussein prepared a birthday party for her in his suite.

In October 1998, Bill Clinton invited Hussein, during his stay at the clinic for chemotherapy treatment, to attend the Wye Plantation talks after a stalemate was reached between the Israeli and Palestinian delegations. Hussein, who looked bald and weakened, arrived and urged both Arafat and Netanyahu to overcome the obstacles. Encouraged by his presence, the two leaders agreed to resolve their difficulties. Hussein received a standing ovation at the ceremony and praise from Clinton for interrupting his treatment and coming over.

At home, 1998 was a difficult year for Jordanians: GDP growth had slowed considerably and could not keep pace with an accelerating population growth. Other incidents included a government scandal involving contamination of the country's water supply. Samih Batikhi, the director of the General Intelligence Directorate (mukhabarat), visited Hussein during his stay at the Mayo Clinic to keep him updated. Batikhi discredited the King's brother Hassan, and often voiced his support for Hussein's eldest son Abdullah as successor. Abdullah, who was 36 years old at the time, enjoyed great support from the army. He was crown prince when he was born in 1962, but Hussein transferred the title to his brother Hassan in 1965 due to political uncertainty back then. King Hussein had changed his line of succession a total of four times: "From his brother Muhammad, to his infant son Abdullah, to his second brother Hassan, and again to his then-grown-up son Abdullah." On his way back to Jordan in January 1999, Hussein stopped in London. Doctors advised him to rest and stay in England for a few weeks, as he was still too fragile to travel. According to Jordanian government sources, Hussein stated that:

I need very much to feel the warmth of my people around me, there is work to be done and I will get the strength from my people to finish the business.

Upon his arrival in Jordan, after a six-month medical absence from the country, he announced he was "completely cured". Hussein returned and publicly criticized his brother Hassan's management of Jordanian internal affairs. He also accused him of abusing his powers as regent and crown prince. On 24 January 1999, Hussein replaced Hassan with his son Abdullah as heir apparent. Hassan gracefully accepted the King's decision on television, and congratulated his nephew Abdullah on his designation as crown prince.

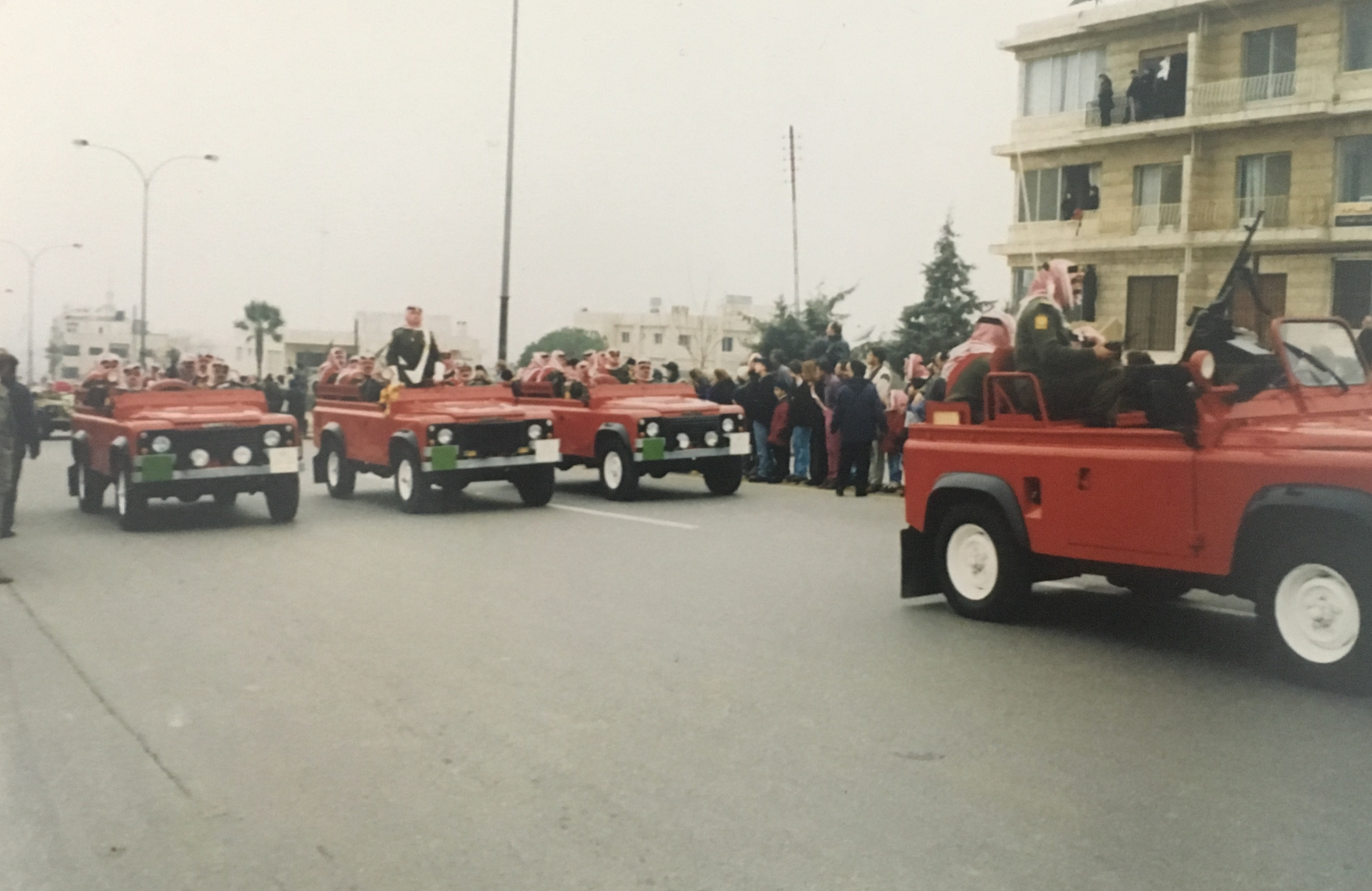
Mourners line up along Zahran street in Amman on 8 February 1999 as royal motorcade transported King's coffin.

On 25 January, the day after he proclaimed Abdullah as crown prince, Hussein returned abruptly to the United States, after experiencing fevers – a sign of recurrent lymphoma. On Tuesday 2 February, the king received a bone marrow transplant, which failed. It was thereupon reported that Hussein had suffered internal organ failure, and was in critical condition. On 4 February, and at his request, he was flown to Jordan where he arrived in a coma. Fighter jets from several countries flew with his plane as it passed over their territories, including the United States, Britain, and Israel. Hussein arrived at the King Hussein Medical Center in Amman where it was raining heavily, yet thousands flocked from all over Jordan and gathered at the main entrance. The crowds chanted his name, some weeping, others holding his pictures. At 11:50 AM on 7 February, Hussein was pronounced dead.

Hussein's flag-draped coffin, accompanied by honor guard troops wearing Keffiyeh, was taken on a 90-minute procession through the streets of the capital city of Amman. Despite the cold and windy weather, an estimated 800,000 Jordanians came to pay their respects. Riot police were stationed along the nine-mile-long route to try to hold back the crowds who scrambled for a glimpse of the coffin.

The UN General Assembly held an Emergency Special Session in "Tribute to the Memory of His Majesty the King of Jordan" on the same day. The King's funeral was held in the Raghadan Palace. The funeral was the largest gathering of foreign leaders since 1995, and it was the first time that Syrian president Hafez al-Assad was in the same room with Israeli statesmen. Khaled Mashal was also in the same room as the Mossad leaders who had tried to assassinate him just two years earlier. Four American presidents were present: Bill Clinton, George H.W. Bush, Jimmy Carter, and Gerald Ford. Bill Clinton said about the funeral: "I don't think I have ever seen a greater outpouring of the world's appreciation and the world's love for a human being than I've seen today." Hussein was succeeded as king by his eldest son, Abdullah II.

== Legacy ==
=== Image ===
All what we hope for is that a day will come, when we have all gone, when people will say that this man has tried, and his family tried. This is all there is to seek in this world.

— Quote by King Hussein a year before his death.

Hussein's biographer Avi Shlaim has stated that the assassination of his grandfather King Abdullah I in Jerusalem was the most formative event in his life, as he had witnessed the event personally at the age of 15. Two years later, the 17-year-old schoolboy would become King. Hussein inherited the throne to a young Kingdom, whose neighbors questioned its legitimacy, along with the Jordanian-controlled West Bank. From an early age he had to shoulder a heavy responsibility. The Kingdom had few natural resources, and a large Palestinian refugee population. He was able to gain his country considerable political weight on a global scale despite its limited potential. In 1980, an Israeli intelligence report described Hussein to be "a man trapped on a bridge burning at both ends, with crocodiles in the river beneath him." Hussein was able to survive through four turbulent decades of the Arab–Israeli conflict and the Cold War, successfully balancing pressures from Arab nationalists, Soviet Union, Western countries and Israel.

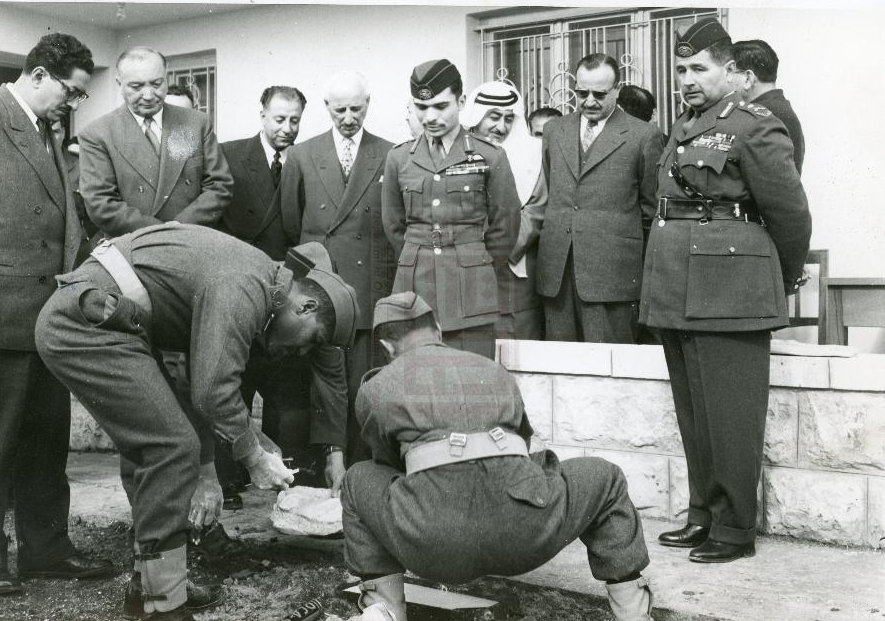
Hussein inaugurating a police station in Amman with Prime Minister Suleiman Nabulsi to his right, 24 December 1956

Hussein considered the Palestinian issue to be the overriding national security issue, even after Jordan lost the West Bank in 1967 and after it renounced claims to it in 1988. Initially, Hussein attempted to unite both banks of the Jordan River as one people, but with the formation of the PLO in the 1960s, it became difficult to maintain such a policy. He was relentless in pursuit of peace, viewing that the only way to solve the conflict was by peaceful means, excluding his decision to join the war in 1967. The decision cost him half his kingdom and his grandfather's legacy. After the war he emerged as an advocate for Palestinian statehood. After renouncing ties to the West Bank in 1988, he remained committed to solving the conflict. His 58 secret meetings held with Israeli representatives since 1963 culminated in the signing of the Israel–Jordan peace treaty in 1994, which he considered to be his "crowning achievement".

Hussein's policy of co-opting the opposition was his most revered. He was the region's longest reigning leader, even though he was subject to dozens of assassination attempts and plots to overthrow him. He was known to pardon political opponents and dissidents, including those who had attempted to assassinate him. He entrusted some of them with senior posts in the government. On one occasion before his death, he gave his fiercest critic a ride home from prison after having ordered his release. He was described as being a "benign authoritarian".

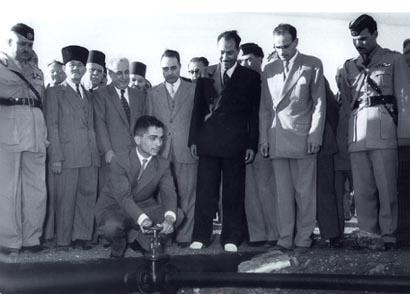
Hussein inaugurating the East Ghor Canal in 1961

During his 46-year-reign, Hussein, who was seen as a charismatic, courageous, and humble leader, became widely known among Jordanians as the "builder king". He turned the Kingdom from a backwater divided polity into a reasonably stable well-governed modern state. By 1999, 90% of Jordanians had been born during Hussein's reign. From the very start, Hussein concentrated on building an economic and industrial infrastructure to stimulate the economy and raise the standard of living. During the 1960s, Jordan's main industries – including phosphate, potash and cement – were developed, and the very first network of highways was built throughout the kingdom. Social indicators reflect King Hussein's successes. Whereas in 1950 water, sanitation, and electricity were available to only 10% of Jordanians, at the end of his rule these had reached 99% of the population. In 1960 only 33% of Jordanians were literate; by 1996 this number had climbed to 85.5%. In 1961 the average Jordanian consumed a daily intake of 2,198 calories; by 1992 this figure had increased by 37.5% to reach 3,022 calories. UNICEF statistics show that between 1981 and 1991, Jordan had achieved the world's fastest annual rate of decline in infant mortality – from 70 deaths per 1,000 births in 1981 to 37 per 1,000 in 1991, a drop of over 47%.

Hussein established the Al-Amal medical center in 1997, a clinic specializing in cancer treatment in Jordan. Renamed in 2002 to the King Hussein Cancer Center in honor of the late King, the center is a leading medical facility in the region, treating around 4,000 patients each year.

=== Criticism ===
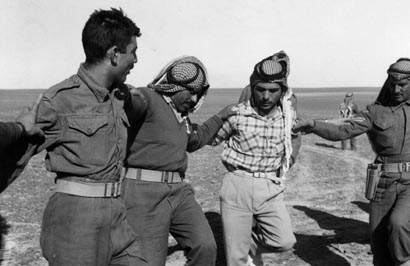
Hussein dancing the dabkeh with Bedouins in the Jordanian Badia, 1960

The King disliked paperwork, and had no solid view for the economy. He was dubbed the "fundraiser-in-chief": throughout his reign he managed to obtain foreign aid from different sources, leaving a legacy of a foreign aid-dependent Jordan. He obtained British aid in the early 1950s, American aid from 1957 onwards, Gulf aid in the 1960s and 1970s, Arab League and Iraqi aid in the early 1980s, and, after formalizing peace with Israel, American aid in the 1990s.

He was also seen as too lenient toward some ministers who were alleged to be corrupt. After establishing peace with Israel in 1994 he faced mounting opposition to the deal, with opponents concentrating their criticism on him. The King reacted by introducing restrictions on freedom of speech, and changing the parliamentary electoral law into the one-man, one-vote system in a bid to increase representation of independent regime loyalists and tribal groups at the expense of Islamist and partisan candidates. The moves impeded Jordan's path towards democracy that had started in 1956 and resumed in 1989.

In 1977, Bob Woodward of The Washington Post reported that King Hussein received funds from the CIA for 20 years. This money was used by the King to establish an intelligence service but was nevertheless criticized for being handled away from the government's supervision.

== Personal life ==
=== Marriages and children ===
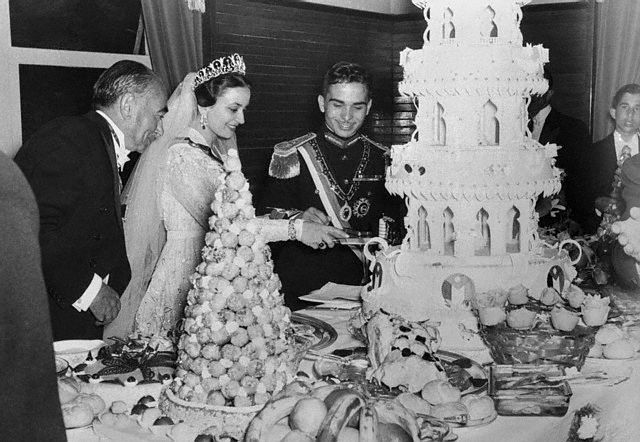
King Hussein and Queen Dina at their wedding on 19 April 1955 at Raghadan Palace

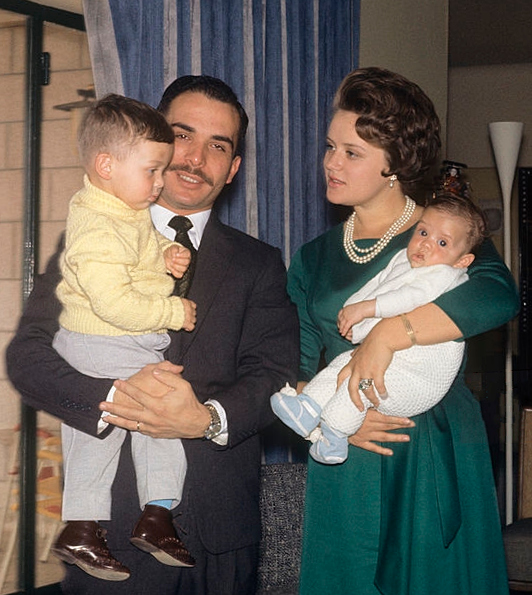
King Hussein and Princess Muna with their sons Prince Abdullah and Prince Faisal in 1964

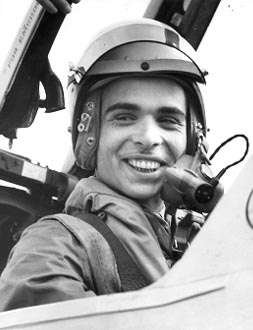
Hussein preparing to fly a de Havilland Vampire aircraft, 1 January 1955

King Hussein was less than seventeen years old, and unmarried, when he came to the throne of Jordan in 1952. He married four times. He had twelve acknowledged children, and one alleged illegitimate child. His wives and children were:

- Sharifa Dina bint Abdul-Hamid (1929–2019), on 19 April 1955. She was an Egyptian-born third cousin of King Hussein's father, King Talal. She was a member of the Hashemite family like Hussein and a graduate of Cambridge University and former lecturer in English literature at Cairo University. The marriage was arranged. They separated in 1956 and were divorced in 1957, at which time Queen Dina became known as Her Royal Highness Princess Dina Abdul-Hamid of Jordan. She became an Egyptian citizen in 1963, and in October 1970, married Lieut-Colonel Asad Sulayman Abd al-Qadir, alias Salah Ta'amari, a Palestinian guerrilla commando who became a high-ranking official in the Palestine Liberation Organization.
  - Princess Alia bint Hussein (born in 1956). Married first to Nasser Wasfi Mirza, they have one child together, a son, Hussein. They divorced in 1987. She remarried in 1988 to Sayyid Mohammed Al-Saleh; they have two sons, Talal and Abdul-Hamid.
- Toni Avril Gardiner (born in 1941), on 25 May 1961. They met when she was working in a secretarial capacity on the sets of the film Lawrence of Arabia. An award-winning field hockey player and daughter of a British army officer, Lieutenant-Colonel Walter Percy Gardiner, she was given the title Her Royal Highness Princess Muna al-Hussein upon her marriage, retaining this title after they divorced on 21 December 1972.
  - Abdullah II (born in 1962). The current King of Jordan. Married to Rania Al-Yassin. They have four children: Crown Prince Hussein, Princess Iman, Princess Salma and Prince Hashem.
  - Prince Faisal bin Hussein (born in 1963). Lieutenant-General, former Commander of Royal Jordanian Air Force. Currently Deputy Supreme Commander of the Jordanian Armed Forces. Married first to Alia Tabbaa (now known as Princess Alia Tabbaa). They have four children: Princess Ayah, Prince Omar, and twins Princess Sara and Princess Aisha. They divorced in 2008. He remarried in 2010 to Sara Qabbani and divorced in 2013. He is now married to Zeina Lubadeh, with whom he has two sons, Prince Abdullah and Prince Muhammad.
  - Princess Aisha bint Hussein (born in 1968, twin with her sister Zein). Brigadier-General of Jordanian Armed Forces. Married to Zeid Juma, they have two children, a son, Aoun, and a daughter, Muna. They are now divorced. She married Ashraf Banayoti in 2016 and divorced him in the same year.
  - Princess Zein bint Hussein (born in 1968, twin with her sister Aisha). Married to Majdi Al-Saleh, they have two children: a son Jaafar and a daughter Jumana, and an adopted daughter called Tahani Al-Shawan.
- Alia Bahauddin Toukan, Queen Alia Al-Hussein (1948–1977), on 24 December 1972. She died in a helicopter crash in Amman, Jordan, in 1977. Jordan's Queen Alia International Airport is named after her. She was the daughter of Jordan's first ambassador to the United Nations, Baha ud-din Toukan.
  - Princess Haya bint Hussein (born in 1974). President of the Fédération Équestre Internationale 2008–2014. Formerly married to Sheikh Mohammed bin Rashid Al Maktoum, vice president and prime minister of the United Arab Emirates and ruler of Dubai. They have two children: Sheikha Jalila and Sheikh Zayed.
  - Prince Ali bin Hussein (born in 1975). Married to Rym Brahimi now known as Princess Rym al-Ali. They have two children, Princess Jalilah and Prince Abdullah.
  - Abir Muhaisen, (born in 1972, adopted by Hussein and Alia in 1976).
- Lisa Najeeb Halaby (born in 1951), renamed Queen Noor Al-Hussein on her conversion to Islam, married in Amman on 15 June 1978. An Arab-American of Syrian descent, daughter of Najeeb Halaby.
  - Hamzah bin Hussein (born in 1980). Married first to Princess Noor bint Asem, third daughter of Prince Asem bin Nayef, by his first wife, Princess Firouzeh Vokhshouri. Princess Noor became Princess Noor al-Hamzah upon her marriage. Together they have a daughter, Princess Haya. They divorced in 2009. He remarried in 2012 to Princess Basmah Bani Ahmad (née Al-Outom); they have four daughters and two sons: Princess Zein, Princess Noor, Princess Badiya, Princess Nafisa, Prince Hussein and Prince Muhammad.
  - Prince Hashim bin Hussein (born in 1981). Married to Princess Fahdah (née Abunayyan). They have three daughters and two sons: Princess Halaah, Princess Rayet Al-Noor, Princess Fatima Al-Alia, Prince Hussein Haidara and Prince Mohammad Al-Hassan.
  - Princess Iman bint Hussein (born in 1983). Married to Zaid Azmi Mirza, together they have a son, Omar.
  - Princess Raiyah bint Hussein (born in 1986). Married to Faris Ned Donovan.

From an affair with the American Jewish actress Susan Cabot, Hussein allegedly had an illegitimate son, Timothy, in 1964. Susan and Timothy were supported for many years out of the Jordanian royal privy purse. In 1986, Timothy killed his mother. He served a prison sentence for involuntary manslaughter and died in 2003.

=== Interests ===
Hussein was an enthusiastic ham radio operator and an honorary member of the Radio Society of Harrow and a life member of the American Radio Relay League. He was popular in the amateur radio community and insisted that fellow operators refer to him without his title. His call sign was JY1, which inspired the name for Jordan's first cube-sat satellite, the JY1-SAT, which was launched in 2018.

Hussein was a trained pilot, flying both airplanes and helicopters as a hobby. In a 1999 interview, Henry Kissinger described being flown by Hussein, saying that "...he was a daring pilot, and he would be zooming along at treetop level, and my wife, in order to be politely insistent would say, 'You know I didn't know helicopters could fly so low.' 'Oh!' said the King, 'They can fly lower!' and went below tree top level just skimming along on the ground. That really aged me rapidly."

Hussein was also an avid fan of motorcycles. The cover of the paperback version of Queen Noor's book Leap of Faith: Memoirs of an Unexpected Life features a photo of the King and Queen riding a Harley-Davidson motorcycle. The King was also a fan of race-car driving, water sports, skiing, and tennis.

== Military ranks and honours ==
=== Military ranks ===
King Hussein I bin Talal I held the following ranks:

- Jordan:
  - (Jordan) Admiral of the Fleet, Royal Jordanian Navy.
  - (Jordan) Field Marshal, Royal Jordanian Army.
  - (Jordan) Marshal of the Air Force, Royal Jordanian Air Force.
- Egypt:
  - (Egypt) Honorary Field Marshal of the Egyptian Army – 21 February 1955.
- United Kingdom:
  - (United Kingdom) Honorary Air Chief Marshal of the Royal Air Force – 19 July 1966

=== National honours ===
- Head of the Order of Hussein bin Ali
- Head of the Supreme Order of the Renaissance
- Head of the Order of the Star of Jordan
- Head of the Order of Independence
- Head of the Order of the Hashemite Star

=== Foreign honours ===
- Austria Grand star Decoration of Honour for Services to the Republic of Austria
- Croatia Grand Cross with Danica star and sash Order of the Crown of King Zvonimir in 1963.
- France Grand Cross of the Legion of Honour
- Germany Grand Cross of the Order of Merit of the Federal Republic of Germany
- South Korea Grand Order of Mugunghwa in 1983
- Spain:
  - Grand Cross with star Order of Isabella the Catholic
  - Knight Order of the Golden Fleece (Spain)
- United Kingdom Honorary Knight Order of the Bath

== Writings ==
- Hussein of Jordan (1962). Uneasy Lies the Head. B. Geis Associates.
- Hussein of Jordan (1969). My War with Israel. Morrow.

== See also ==
- King Abdullah II
- Hashemites
- List of kings of Jordan
- List of things named after King Hussein
- List of covers of Time magazine (1960s)

== Bibliography ==
- Ashton, Nigel (2008). King Hussein of Jordan: A Political Life (Yale University Press); excerpt.
- Dann, Uriel (1989). King Hussein and the Challenge of Arab Radicalism. Oxford University Press. ISBN 978-0-19-536121-6.
- Hiro, Dilip (2003), The Essential Middle East: A Comprehensive Guide, Carroll & Graf Publishers, ISBN 0-7867-1269-4
- Pearson, Ivan L. G. (2010). In the Name of Oil: Anglo-American Relations in the Middle East, 1950–1958. Sussex Academic Press. ISBN 978-1-84519-388-1.
- Salibi, Kamal (1998). The Modern History of Jordan. I.B. Tauris. ISBN 978-1860643316.
- Shlaim, Avi (2009). Lion of Jordan: The Life of King Hussein in War and Peace. Vintage Books. ISBN 978-1400078288.
- Yitzhak, Ronen (2012). Abdullah Al-Tall, Arab Legion Officer: Arab Nationalism and Opposition to the Hashemite Regime. Sussex Academic Press. ISBN 978-1-84519-408-6.

Hussein of Jordan House of Hashim Born: 14 November 1953
Regnal titles
Preceded by Talal	King of Jordan; 1952–1999	Succeeded by Abdullah II
