= 1989 Jordanian protests =

Protests against Jordanian government

- Date: 18 April 1989 – 30 May 1989
- Caused by: Corruption; Inflation; Unemployment
- Goals: Lifting of martial law; Electoral reform; Holding parliamentary elections; Removal of restrictions on freedom of the press; Dismissal of prime minister Zaid Al-Rifai
- Methods: Demonstrations; Riots
- Status: King Hussein dismisses prime minister Zaid Al-Rifai and appoints Zaid ibn Shaker to form a government; Parliamentary elections held for the first time in 22 years (since 1967); Royal commission established in April 1990 for drafting the National Charter

Parties
Tribal towns Muslim Brotherhood	Jordanian Government

Lead figures
Tribal leaders Muslim Brotherhood figures	King Hussein; Zaid Al-Rifai

Number
4,000	Unknown

Casualties and losses
6 dead 42 injured	2 dead 47 injured

The 1989 Jordanian protests (Arabic: هبة نيسان, April boon) started in Ma'an on 18 April after the government cut food subsidies, increasing food price. Demonstrations and riots quickly reached neighboring southern towns. Protestors accused the government of rampant corruption, and demanded that the prime minister Zaid Al-Rifai lose his job; martial law be lifted; the electoral laws be reformed; and restrictions on freedom of expression and freedom of the press be removed.

The Jordanian economy was suffering a recession during that time after Jordan disengaged from the West Bank in 1988. King Hussein responded to the protests by sacking Al-Rifai, lifting martial law that had been in place since 1957, and resuming parliamentary elections that had been paused since 1967. The King also appointed a royal commission to draft the National Charter, a document with a timetable for reforms and democratization acts.

Jordan held parliamentary elections on 8 November 1989, the first in 22 years, and the National Charter was drafted in 1990. Some Arab countries, primarily Saudi Arabia, were apprehensive about Jordan's democratization.

== Background ==
A general election took place in 1967 just before Jordan lost the West Bank, and when the parliament's tenure ended in 1971, no elections could be held due to the fact that the West Bank was under Israeli occupation. In 1984, Hussein appointed a parliament from both banks of the Jordan River.

Jordan's disengagement from the West Bank (renouncing claim of sovereignty and cutting administrative links) the previous year in July 1988, proved to be depressing for the economy. Jordan's foreign debt was double that of its gross national product (GNP). Jordan was combating an economic crisis with austerity measures, Western economists attributed the crisis due to government overspending. The Jordanian dinar had lost a third of its value in 1988.

An IMF statement read: "Jordan agreed to strengthen foreign reserves, reduce inflation through tight credit policies and improve the current account balance. It also pledged to reform the tax system and reduce its budget deficit."

== Protests ==
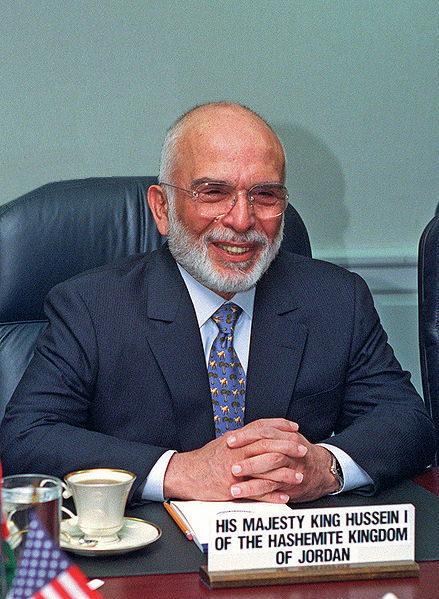
King Hussein

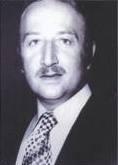
Prime minister Zaid Al-Rifai

On 16 April, the Government increased prices of gasoline, licensing fees, alcoholic beverages and cigarettes, between 15% and 50%, in a bid to increase revenues per an agreement with the International Monetary Fund (IMF). The IMF agreement was to enable Jordan to reschedule its $6 billion debt, and obtain loans totaling $275 million over 18 months. On 18 April, riots from Ma'an spread to other southern towns like Al-Karak and Tafila, where The New York Times reported that around 4,000 people gathered in the streets and clashed with the police. 6 protestors were killed, and 42 were injured, while 2 policemen were killed and 47 were injured in the clashes.

Despite the fact that the protests were triggered by a troubling economic situation, the crowd's demands became political. Protestors accused the government of rampant corruption, and demanded that the prime minister Zaid Al-Rifai be sacked; martial law be lifted; the electoral laws be reformed; and restrictions on freedom of expression and freedom of the press be removed.

== Response ==
Hussein relented to the demands by dismissing Zaid Al-Rifai, and appointing Zaid ibn Shaker to form a new government. In 1986 a new electoral law was passed, thus the decision to reintroduce parliamentary elections went smoothly. The cabinet passed amendments to the electoral law that excluded articles dealing with West Bank representation.

In May 1989 just before the elections, Hussein announced his intentions of appointing a 60-person royal commission to draft a reformist document named the National Charter. The National Charter sought to set a timetable for democratization acts. Although most members of the commission were regime loyalists, it included a number of opposition figures and critics.

Parliamentary elections were held on 8 November 1989, the first in 22 years (since 1967). The National Charter was drafted and ratified by parliament in 1991.

Prince Ra'ad bin Zeid, Hussein's cousin who was Lord Chamberlain of Jordan, later said in an interview about Jordan's 1989 moves towards democracy:

Many Arab leaders were not pleased about this. They felt that King Hussein was letting the genie out of the bottle. In addition, they accused him of interfering indirectly in their domestic politics. They were especially critical of the notion of citizens' rights. The Saudis and others felt that Shari'a law included that. They were apprehensive. They did not understand the relevancy of democracy to the Saudi people. For them the Shari'a law was all that the Saudi people needed.

== See also ==
- 1989 Jordanian general election
- 2011–12 Jordanian protests
- 2018 Jordanian protests
