= JY1-SAT =

- Mission type: Technology
- Operator: Crown Prince Foundation
- COSPAR ID: 2018-099AX
- SATCAT no.: 43803
- Website: cpf.jo

Spacecraft properties
- BOL mass: 1.11 kg (2.4 lb)
- Dimensions: 10 x 10 x 11.35 cm

Start of mission
- Launch date: 06:34, December 3, 2018 (UTC)
- Rocket: Falcon 9 Full Thrust
- Launch site: Vandenberg
- Contractor: SpaceX
- Deployment date: December 2018

Orbital parameters
- Regime: Low Earth

JY1-SAT is a cubesat that is Jordan's first satellite. It was launched aboard SpaceX's Falcon 9 from the Vandenberg Air Force Base in the United States on 3 December 2018. It is named in tribute of the late King Hussein who was an amateur ham radio operator; his callsign was "JY1". The project was built by Jordanian students from various universities, and was funded by Jordan's Crown Prince Foundation.
