= Alia Tabbaa =

Jordanian princess

Princess Alia Tabbaa
- Born: 15 September 1964 (age 62); Amman, Jordan
- Spouse: Prince Faisal bin Hussein (m. 1987; div. 2008)
- Issue: Princess Ayah; Prince Omar; Princess Sara; Princess Aisha
- Father: Sayyid Tawfik Al-Tabbaa
- Mother: Lamia Addem

Princess Alia Tabbaa (Arabic: عالية الطباع, born 15 September 1964) is the first wife of Prince Faisal bin Hussein.

She is the daughter of Sayyid Tawfik Al-Tabbaa and Lamia Addem. Her father was a well-known and respected Damascene businessman, and the founder and president of the Royal Jordanian Airlines.

Alia and Faisal have four children together:

- Princess Ayah bint Faisal (born on 11 February 1990)
- Prince Omar bin Faisal (born on 22 October 1993)
- Princess Sara bint Faisal (born on 27 March 1997) (twin of Aisha)
- Princess Aisha bint Faisal (born on 27 March 1997) (twin of Sara)

Alia studied at The Ahliyyah School for Girls, in Amman, Jordan during her school years. She subsequently attended the University of Sussex, where she studied International Relations.

She is currently the president of the Promise Welfare Society. She is also the president of the Multiple Sclerosis Foundation, and as of 2006 became the president of the Cerebral Palsy Foundation, following Queen Noor of Jordan.

== Honours ==
=== Foreign honours ===
- Spain: Dame Grand Cross of the Royal Order of Isabella the Catholic (26 May 2006).
