= Prince Faisal bin Hussein =

Jordanian prince

Prince Faisal bin Al Hussein
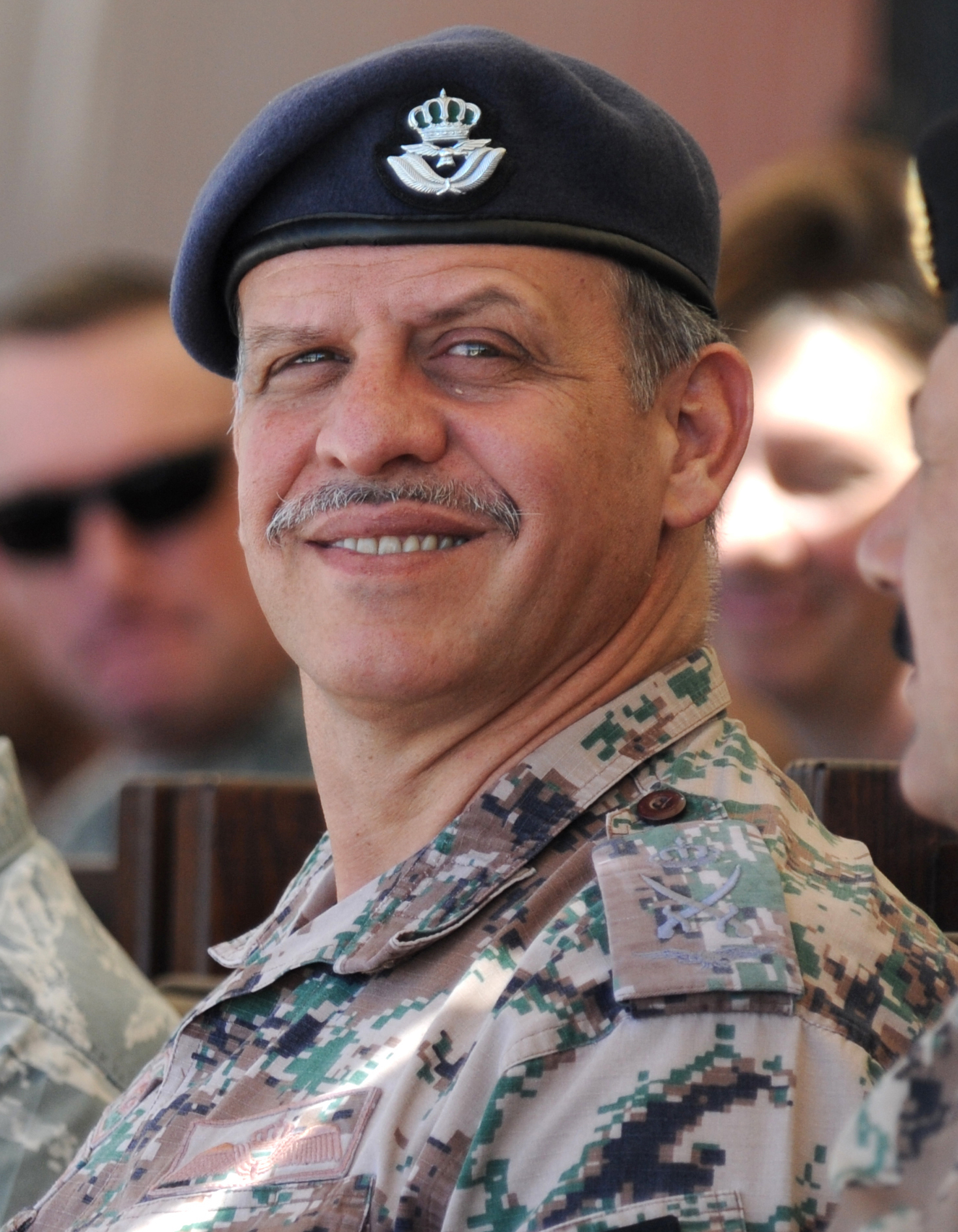
- Prince Faisal in 2014
- Born: 11 October 1963 (age 63); Amman, Jordan
- Spouse: Alia Tabbaa (m. 1987; div. 2008) Sara Kabbani (m. 2010; div. 2013) Zeina Lubbadeh (m. 2014)
- Issue: Princess Ayah; Prince Omar; Princess Sara; Princess Aisha; Prince Abdullah; Prince Muhammad
Names
- Faisal bin Hussein bin Talal bin Abdullah
- House: Hashemite
- Father: Hussein of Jordan
- Mother: Toni Gardiner

Prince Faisal bin Al Hussein (Arabic: فيصل بن الحسين; born 11 October 1963) is a Jordanian prince who is a son of King Hussein and Princess Muna, and the younger brother of King Abdullah II. Periodically he has served as regent during his brother's absences abroad.

== Early life ==
Faisal was born on 11 October 1963 at Palestine Hospital in Al Abdali, Amman, Faisal was early schooling in Amman, when he was sent in 1970 to his mother's native United Kingdom where he attended St. Edmund's School in Hindhead, England. In the following year, he moved to the United States where he attended the Bement School in Deerfield, Massachusetts for the next two years. He then moved schools again, this time to Eaglebrook School, also in Deerfield. In 1978, Faisal commenced his high school education at St. Albans School in Washington, D.C., from which he graduated in 1981. His initial university education was at Brown University from which he graduated in 1985 with a ScB degree in electrical engineering. The prince also earned a master's degree in management from the London Business School in 1988. During his university years, Faisal took flying lessons and obtained a private pilot's license.

== Military service ==
Prior to graduating from Brown University, Faisal served in the Royal Jordanian Air Force (RJAF), where he received helicopter training. In the summer of 1985, he gained his RJAF wings and then underwent officer training with the Royal Air Force at Cranwell. Remaining at Cranwell, he did his RAF Basic Flying Training in 1986 before moving to RAF Valley where he completed Advanced Flying Training on jets and received his RAF wings in 1987. Later that year, Feisal completed further flying training at the Tactical Weapons Unit, at Chivenor in Devon.

In September 2004, Faisal was appointed an assistant to the Chairman of the Joint Chiefs of Staff, with the rank of Lieutenant General. He retired from the Royal Jordanian Army in December 2017.

== Other ventures ==
Faisal has been President of the Jordan Olympic Committee since 2003 and chairman and Founder of Generations For Peace since 2007, a non-profit peace building organization, the brainchild of his ex-wife Sarah Kabbani who was also his advisor for many years before their marriage. Following a period of strategic development and implementation of unique peace through sport programs run jointly by Sarah and Faisal, he was elected as a member of the International Olympic Committee in 2010.

In 2019, he was elected on to the IOC's executive board and is, as of 2023, Chair of the IOC's Safeguarding Working Group, Chair of the Prevention of Harassment and Abuse in Sport Working Group and Vice Chair of the Gender Equality, Diversity and Inclusion Commission. Faisal has also been a member of the Olympic Council of Asia's executive board since 2007, through his role as their Peace Through Sport Committee chair, while he is an Ex Officio Member of the Association of National Olympic Committees’ Executive Council due to his position as Chair of the Gender Equity Commission. In September 2024, he was announced as one of seven candidates in the running to succeed Thomas Bach as IOC president. He received just two votes at the 144th IOC Session in March 2025, with Kirsty Coventry winning the election.

From time to time, he has served as regent while his brother the king was out of the country.

== Personal life ==
Faisal has married three times. He married for the first time in August 1987. The bride, Alia Tabbaa is the daughter of Sayyid Tawfik al-Tabbah, founder and president of Royal Jordanian Airlines and his wife, Lamia Addem. They have four children together:

- Princess Ayah (11 February 1990)
- Prince Omar (22 October 1993)
- Princess Sara (27 March 1997) (twin of Aisha)
- Princess Aisha (27 March 1997) (twin of Sara)

Faisal and Alia divorced in April 2008. Faisal was then married to Sara Bassam Qabbani. They were engaged on 20 March 2010 in Jeddah, Saudi Arabia and were married on 24 May 2010. Faisal and Sara were divorced on 14 September 2013. The couple had no children together.

On 4 January 2014, Faisal married Jordanian radio presenter Zeina Lubbadeh, daughter of businessman Fares Lubbadeh. The wedding ceremony was held at her parents' home in Amman, Jordan. The couple have two sons:

- Prince Abdullah bin Faisal (born 17 February 2016)
- Prince Muhammad bin Faisal (born 8 April 2017)

== Honours ==
=== National honours ===
- Grand Cordon of the Supreme Order of the Renaissance, Special Class
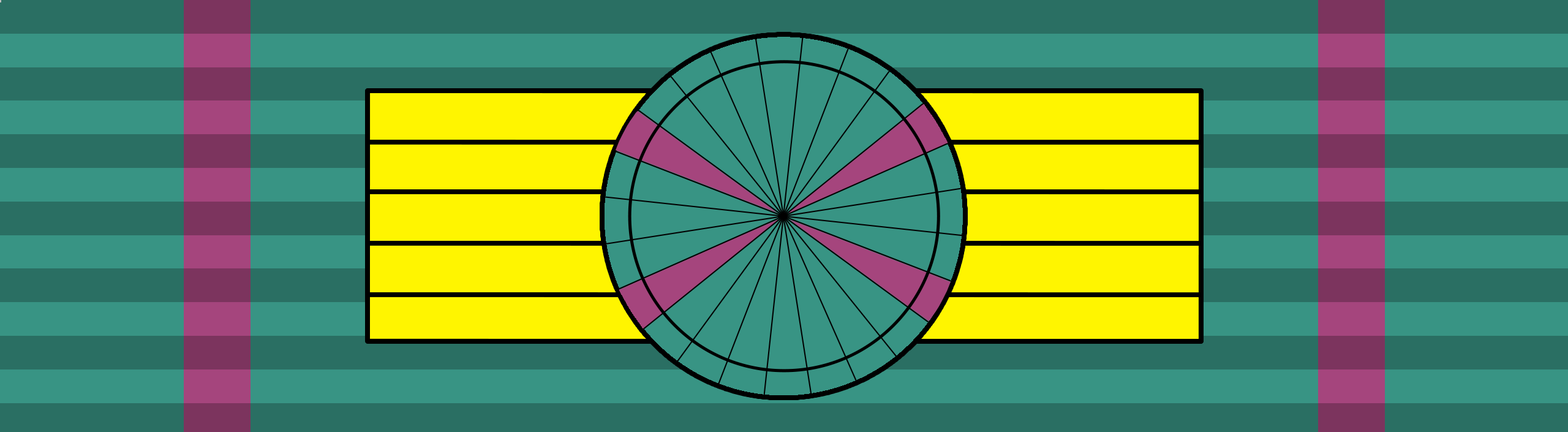
- Grand Cordon of the Order of the Star of Jordan
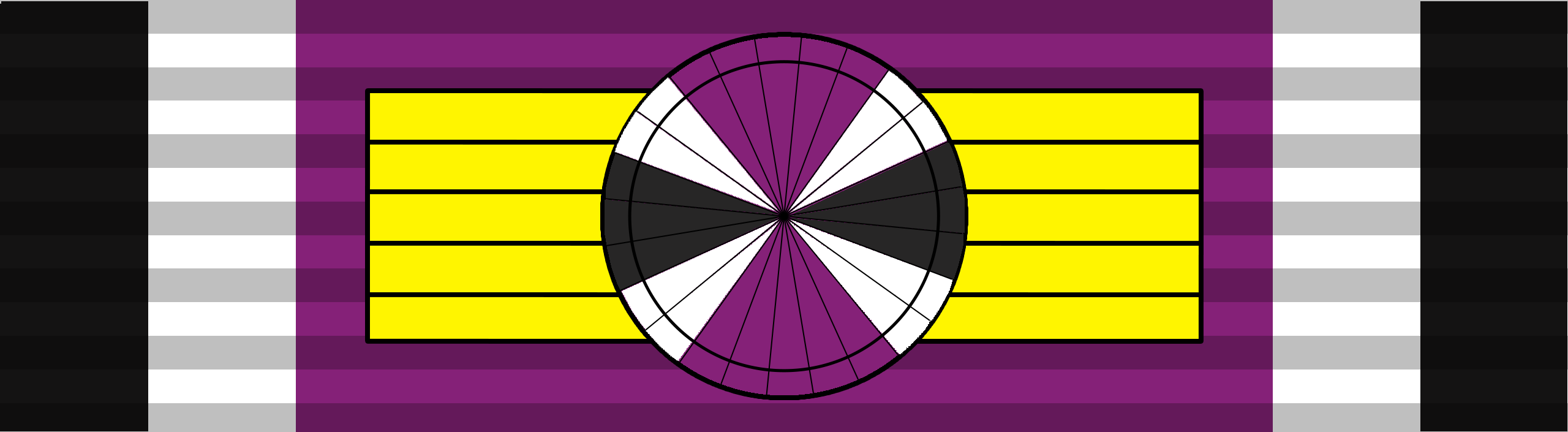
- Grand Cordon of the Order of Independence
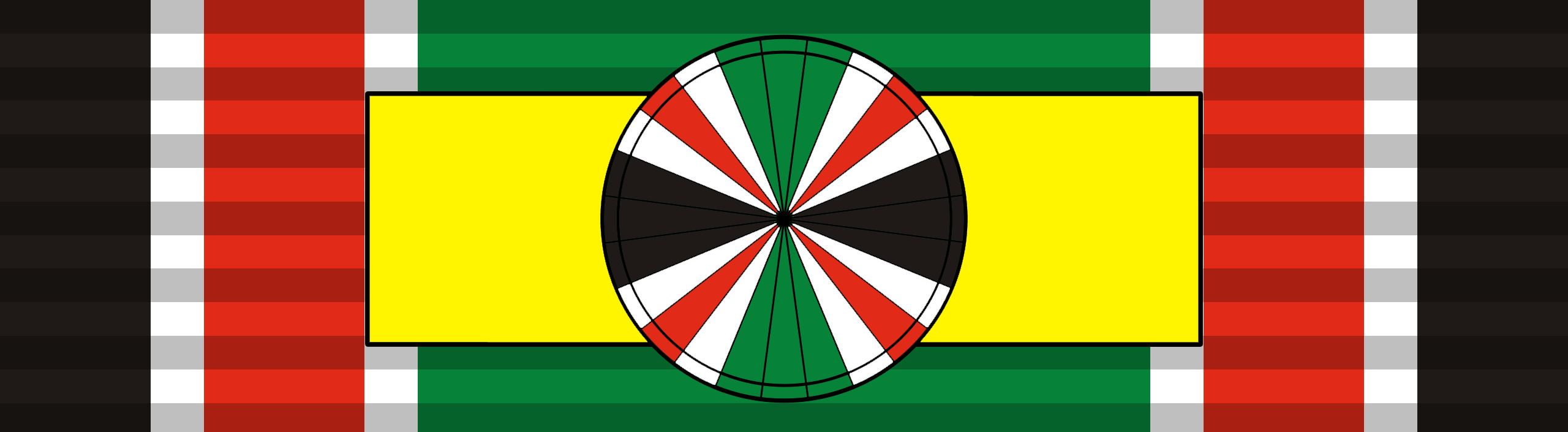
- Grand Cordon of the Order of Military Merit
- Grand Cordon of the King Abdullah II ibn Al Hussein Order for Distinction
- Recipient of the Al-Hussein Medal of Excellence, 1st Class
- Recipient of the Long Service Medal
- Recipient of the Administrative and Leadership Competence Medal
- Recipient of the Administrative and Technical Competence Medal
- Recipient of the Administrative and Training Competence Medal

=== Foreign honours ===
- Chile: Grand Cross of the Order of Bernardo O'Higgins
- France: Grand Officer of the Order of the Legion of Honour
- Oman: Member 1st Class of the Order of Sultan Qaboos
- Spain: Knight Grand Cross of the Order of Isabella the Catholic
- Taiwan: Special Grand Cordon of the Order of the Cloud and Banner
- United States: Commander of the Legion of Merit

Military offices
Preceded by So'oud Nuseirat	Commander, RJAF; 2002–2004	Succeeded by Hussein Al Biss
Royal titles
Preceded by Prince Hashem bin Al Abdullah	Line of succession to the Jordanian throne 3rd position	Succeeded by Prince Omar bin Al Faisal
