= 1989 Jordanian general election =

General elections were held in Jordan on 8 November 1989, the first since 1967. As political parties were banned at the time, all 647 candidates ran as independents, although 22 of the 80 successful candidates were Muslim Brotherhood members. Voter turnout was 53.1%.

== See also ==
- 1989 Jordanian protests
