= List of things named after King Hussein =

This is a list of places, buildings, roads and other things named for King Hussein. It is divided by category, though each item's location is noted in the entry.

== Hospitals ==
- King Hussein Cancer Center
- King Hussein Medical Center

== Airports ==
- King Hussein International Airport
