= Multiple Sclerosis Foundation =

MS Focus: The Multiple Sclerosis Foundation, also known as the Multiple Sclerosis Foundation or just MS Focus, is a 501(c)(3) non-profit organization benefiting people with multiple sclerosis and their families. It was established in 1986, and is headquartered in Fort Lauderdale, Florida.

MS Focus' resources assist people who have MS, their families and caregivers, regional support groups, and healthcare professionals. Access to programs and services is available through the web site or a helpline staffed by caseworkers and peer counselors. All of MS Focus' services, as well as information, literature and subscriptions to publications are provided free of charge. The group neither sells memberships nor requires individuals or support groups to participate in fund-raising activities.

The Foundation also provides MS statistics to media outlets.

MS Focus publishes a quarterly magazine (MS Focus Magazine) and broadcasts an internet radio station, MS Focus Radio.

According to the Better Business Bureau, the Multiple Sclerosis Foundation did not disclose accountability information, and therefore the BBB could not determine if the charity adheres to its Standards for Charity Accountability.
