= 1967 Jordanian general election =

General elections were held in Jordan on 27 April 1967. As political parties were banned at the time, all candidates ran as independents. Voter turnout was 70.0%.
