= Princess Iman bint Hussein =

Jordanian princess (born 1983)

- Born: 24 April 1983 (age 43); King Hussein Medical Center, Amman, Jordan
- Spouse: Zaid Azmi Mirza (m. 2013; div. 2017)
- Issue: Omar Mirza
Names
- Iman bint Hussein bin Talal bin Abdullah
- House: Hashemite
- Father: Hussein of Jordan
- Mother: Lisa Halaby

Princess Iman bint Hussein (born 24 April 1983) is a Jordanian princess.

== Early life ==
On 24 April 1983, Princess Iman was born at King Hussein Medical Center in Wadi Al-Seer, Amman, Jordan. Princess Iman is the daughter of King Hussein and Queen Noor of Jordan. She is the half-sister of King Abdullah II of Jordan, Princess Alia, Prince Faisal, Princess Aisha, Princess Zein, Princess Haya, Prince Ali, and sister of Prince Hamzah, Prince Hashem, and Princess Raiyah.

== Education ==
Princess Iman studied at Garrison Forest School in Baltimore, Maryland, the Fay School in Massachusetts and the Maret School in Washington, D.C. She joined the Royal Military Academy Sandhurst in 2002 and finished her training there on 8 August 2003. She enrolled at American University in Washington, D.C., in 2003 and graduated in 2007 with a degree in Sociology.

== Personal life ==
On 20 December 2012, the Royal Court of Jordan announced Princess Iman's engagement to businessman Zaid Azmi Mirza. They married on 22 March 2013. She gave birth to a son, Omar, on 7 October 2014. The couple divorced in 2017.

== Honours ==
- Jordan
  - Knight Grand Cordon of the Supreme Order of the Renaissance, Special Class
  - Knight Grand Cordon of the Order of Military Merit
  - Recipient of the Al-Hussein Medal of Excellence, 2nd Class
