= Princess Fahdah Hashim =

Jordanian princess

- Born: Fahdah Mohammed Abunayyan; 20 July 1983 (age 43); Riyadh, Saudi Arabia
- Spouse: Prince Hashim bin Hussein (m. 2006)
- Issue: Princess Haalah bint Hashim; Princess Rayet Al-Noor; Princess Fatima Al-Alia; Prince Hussein Haidara; Prince Mohammad Al-Hassan
- Father: Sheikh Mohammad bin Ibrahim Abunayyan

Princess Fahdah Hashim (born Fahdah Mohammed Abunayyan) is a Saudi member of the Jordanian royal family. She is married to Prince Hashim bin Hussein, the younger son of King Hussein and Queen Noor.

== Background ==
Princess Fahdah is from Saudi Arabia. She is the daughter of Sheikh Mohammad bin Ibrahim bun Suleiman Abuniyyan. Her maternal grandfather, Sheikh Turki bin Khaled bin Ahmed Al Sudairi, served as head of the Saudi Human Rights Commission.

== Marriage and royal life ==
On 15 April 2006, she married Prince Hashim bin Hussein, the younger son of King Hussein of Jordan and Queen Noor of Jordan. They have three daughters and two sons:

- Princess Haalah bint Hashim, born on 6 April 2007
- Princess Rayet Al-Noor bint Hashim, born on 4 July 2008.
- Princess Fatima Al-Alia bint Hashim, on 5 November 2011.
- Prince Hussein Haidara bin Hashim, on 15 June 2015.
- Prince Mohammad Al-Hassan bin Hashim, on 21 October 2019.

On 1 June 2023, she attended the Wedding of Hussein, Crown Prince of Jordan, and Rajwa Al Saif.
