= Princess Raiyah bint Hussein =

Jordanian royal (born 1986)

Princess Raiyah bint Al Hussein
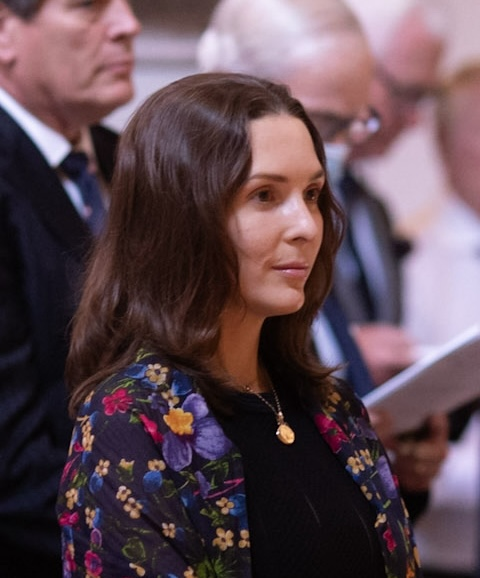
- Princess Raiyah in 2023
- Born: 9 February 1986 (age 40); Amman, Jordan
- Spouse: Faris Ned Donovan (m. 2020; div. 2026)
Names
- Raiyah bint Hussein bin Talal bin Abdullah
- House: Hashemite
- Father: Hussein of Jordan
- Mother: Lisa Halaby
- Occupation: Academic

Princess Raiyah bint Al Hussein (Arabic: راية بنت الحسين; born 9 February 1986) is the youngest daughter of King Hussein of Jordan and Queen Noor. She has two brothers, Hamzah and Hashem, as well as an elder sister, Princess Iman. She is a half-sister to King Abdullah II of Jordan.

== Early life and education ==
Princess Raiyah was born on 9 February 1986 at King Hussein Medical Center in Wadi Al-Seer, Amman, She is youngest daughter of the four children of Hussein of Jordan and Queen Noor of Jordan. She attended the United World College of the Atlantic in Wales and received her undergraduate degree in Japanese at the University of Edinburgh. She took a year abroad studying at Ritsumeikan University in Japan. She received a postgraduate degree in Japanese literature from Columbia University.

She later moved to Tokyo, where she spent three years working in the field of human development.

Currently, Princess Raiyah is a graduate student studying a PhD in the Department of Asian Languages and Cultures on "the reception of medieval warrior narratives in Japan and the Arab World and their impact upon the construction of national identities" at the University of California, Los Angeles (UCLA).

== Official duties ==
Princess Raiyah took part in official visits to Japan in 2007 and 2008, and accompanied King Abdullah II to the country in April 2009. In 2008, she formed part of a Jordanian delegation during an official visit with King Abdullah II to South Korea.

== Personal life ==
On 5 November 2019, the court announced Princess Raiyah's engagement to British-born journalist Ned Donovan, son of writer Tessa Dahl and Patrick Donovan, maternal grandson of Roald Dahl and Patricia Neal, and paternal grandson of Francis Patrick Donovan and Maria Kozslik. His half-sister is the model Sophie Dahl, who is married to the singer Jamie Cullum.

The pair married on 7 July 2020 in the United Kingdom with the permission of King Abdullah II, after their planned wedding in Jordan was cancelled due to the COVID-19 pandemic. In 2023, she was made a Dame of the Order of St. John. They divorced in 2026.

Princess Raiyah is reportedly close with Talulah Riley, who referred to Raiyah as “my brain twin and most beloved voice in the universe” in the acknowledgment section of one of her novels.

== Patronages ==
- Patron of The Performing Arts Center of Jordan.

== Honours ==
- Jordan:
  - Knight Grand Cordon, Special Class of the Supreme Order of the Renaissance
  - Recipient of the Al-Hussein Medal of Excellence in Gold (First Class)
- United Kingdom:
  - Dame of Justice of the Order of Saint John of Jerusalem (12 April 2023)
