= Fay School =

- Fay School's logo

Location
- 48 Main Street; Southborough, Massachusetts 01772; United States; 42°18′17″N 71°31′59″W

Information
- Type: Junior boarding school
- Motto: Poteris Modo Velis (You Can If You Will)
- Established: 1866
- Founders: Eliza Burnett Fay; Harriet Burnett
- Head of Upper School (7-9): Susanna Whitaker Waters
- Faculty: 80
- Grades: K–9
- Gender: Coeducational
- Enrollment: 475 total (325 day, 150 boarding)
- Average class size: 14
- Student to teacher ratio: 6:1
- Language: English
- Campus: 30 acre main campus, 36 acre athletic campus
- Campus type: Suburban
- Colors: Red and white
- Athletics: Yes
- Athletics conference: New England Preparatory School Athletic Conference
- Mascot: Moose
- Newspaper: Fay Newsletter
- Yearbook: Pioneer
- Website: www.fayschool.org

Fay School, founded in 1866 by the Fay sisters, is an independent, coeducational day and boarding school located in Southborough, Massachusetts.

== History ==
=== Founding and early years ===
Fay School was founded in 1866 by sisters Eliza Burnett Fay and Harriet Burnett in a former parsonage of the Unitarian church, across from St. Mark's School, where Fay students traditionally attended secondary school. In its first school year, the school had only seven students: five day students and two boarders.

=== Expansion ===
Under Eliza Fay's son, Waldo B. Fay, the school grew sizably, adding a new dormitory, school room, and library. In 1922, the school was officially incorporated, and the ownership of the school was transferred from the Fay family to the newly formed board of trustees. The school became fully coeducational in 1977, having previously implemented a pilot program for girls in 1972. Girls had previously attended the school as day students through the late 19th century. The Root Academic Building, the main academic building of the campus, was constructed in 2001. Fay opened its Primary School (pre-K to 2nd grade) in 2010 and moved its 6th grade into the Lower School program (now 3rd to 6th grade) in the 2012–13 school year.

=== Headmasters ===
List of Fay School Headmasters
Name	Years in Office
Eliza Burnett Fay	1866-1896 (29–30 years)
Waldo B. Fay	1896-1918 (21–22 years)
Edward W. Fay	1918-1942 (23–24 years)
Harrison L. Reinke	1942-1969 (26–27 years)
A. Brooks Harlow Jr.	1969-1988 (18–19 years)
Stephen V. A. Samborski	1988-1990 (1–2 years)
Stephen C. White	1990-2008 (17–18 years)
Robert J. Gustavson Jr.	2008-2024 (17–18 years)
Susanna Whitaker Waters	2024-Incumbent (1–2 years)

== Campus facilities ==
The school is situated on a 30-acre main campus, with a 36-acre athletic campus 1.5 miles away in Marlborough. Apart from the Root Academic Building, there are multiple other buildings at Fay: the Center for Creativity and Design, the Picardi Art Building, the Reinke Building, and the Harris Event Center, which contains the theater. Below the theater is the Harlow Gymnasium, which contains the locker rooms, four basketball courts, an indoor rock climbing wall, and a fitness room. In addition, there are six soccer fields, four tennis courts, two swimming pools, a football field, and the multi-purpose MacAusland Field. For meals, students go to the Camp Family Dining Hall, which is currently operated by FLIK ISD. There are currently seven dormitory buildings: two boy dorms and five girl dorms, housing its 150 boarding students from 7th to 9th grade.

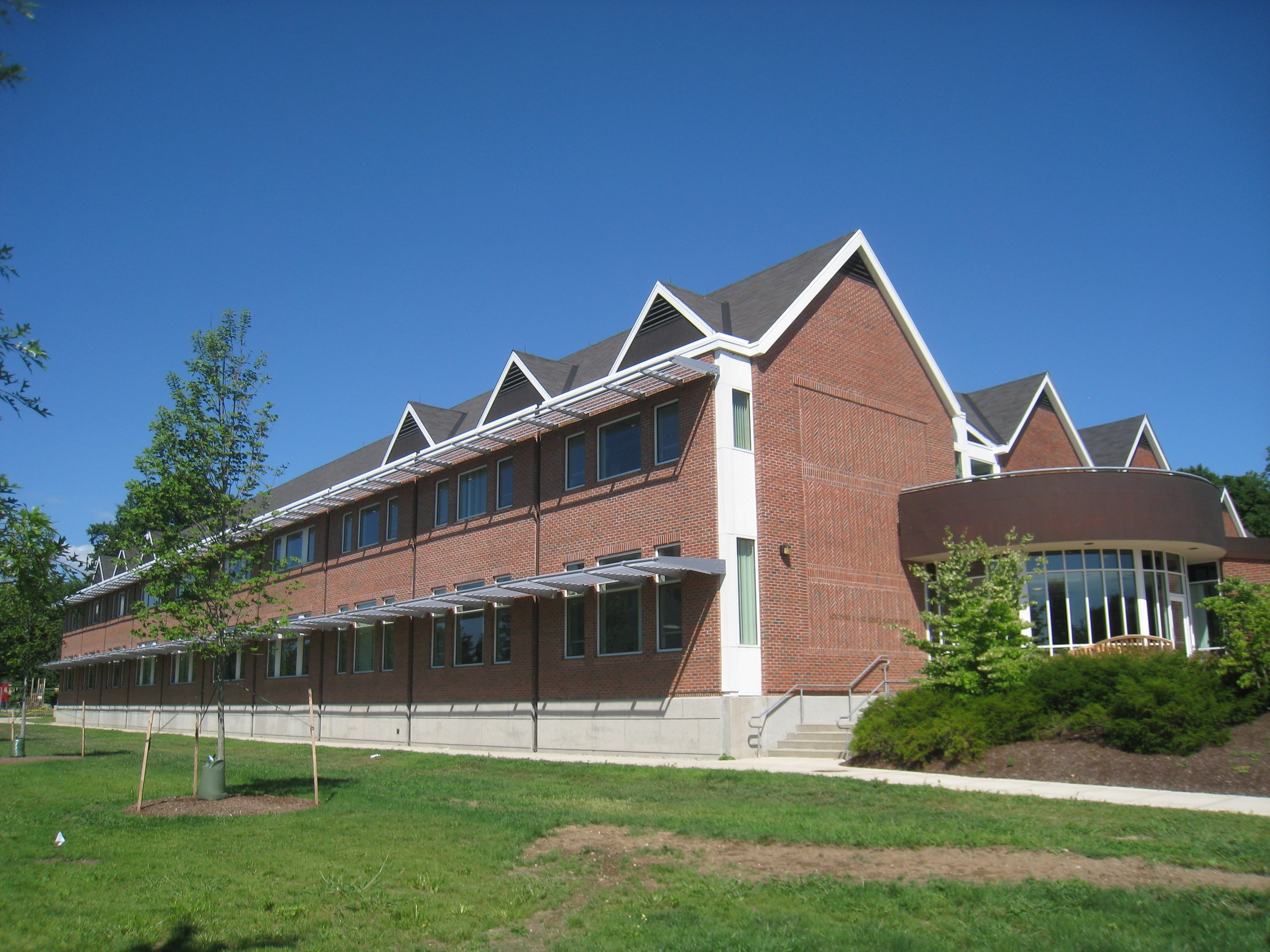
Root Academic Building

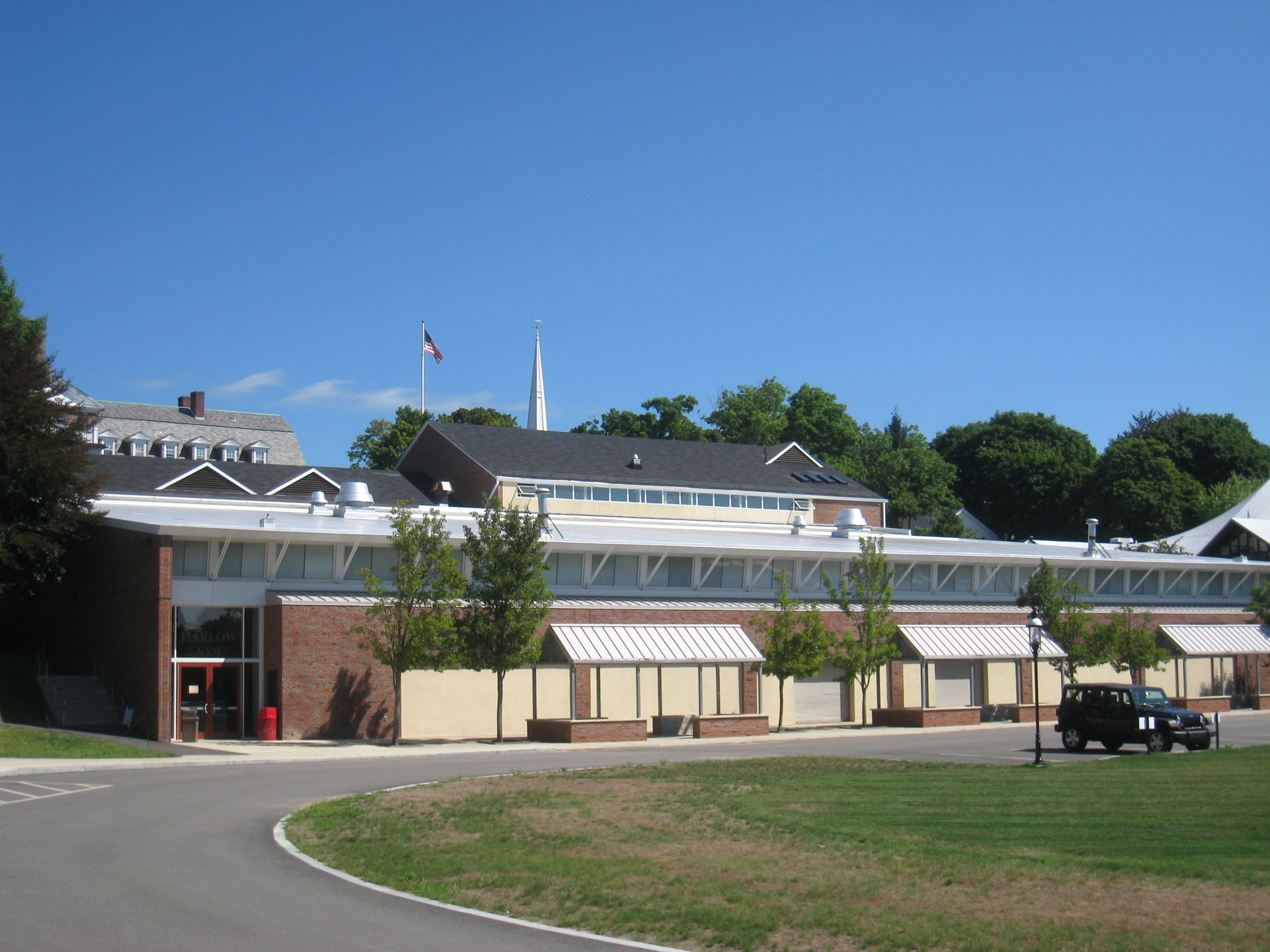
Harlow Gymnasium

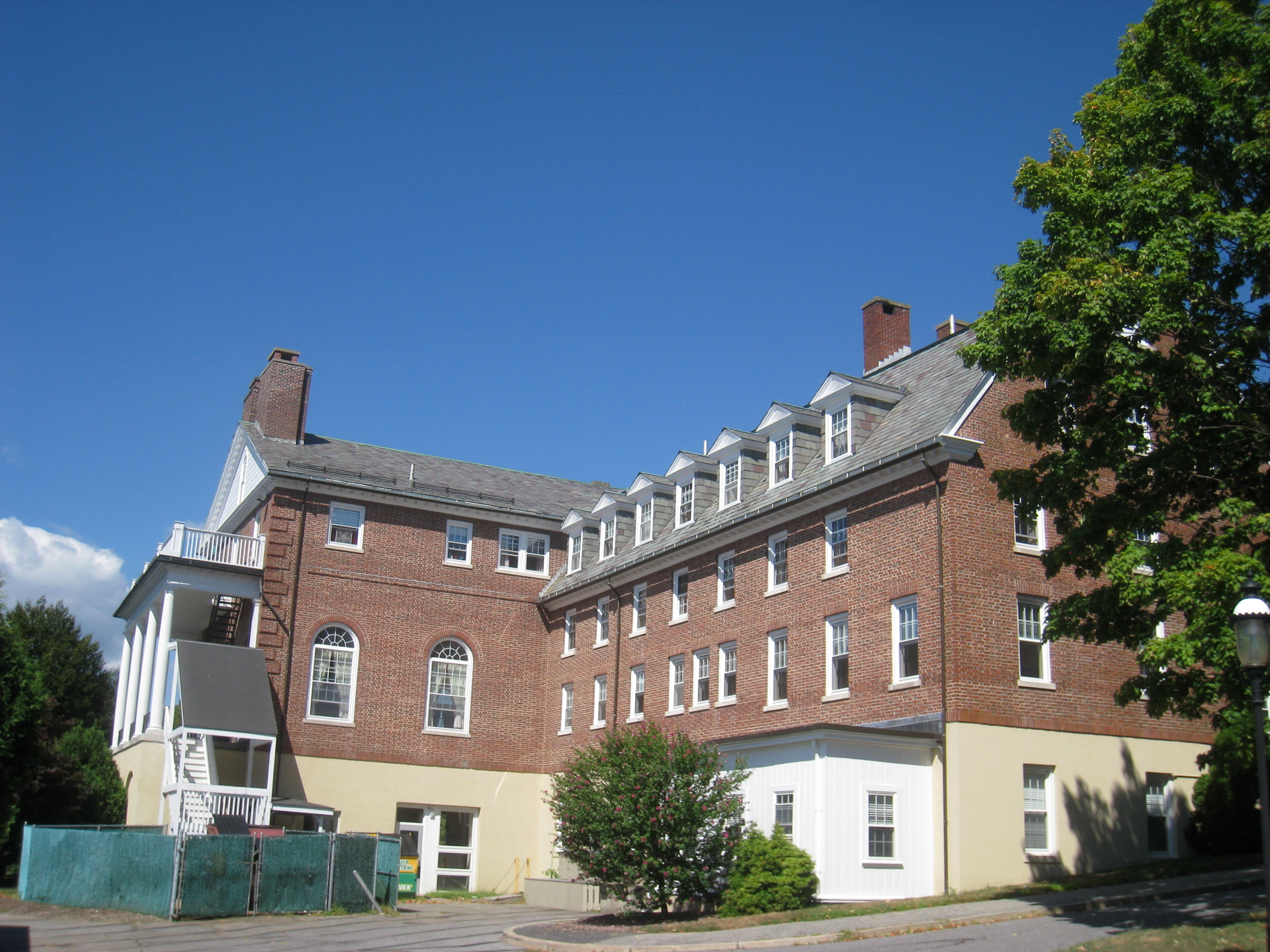
Dining Hall

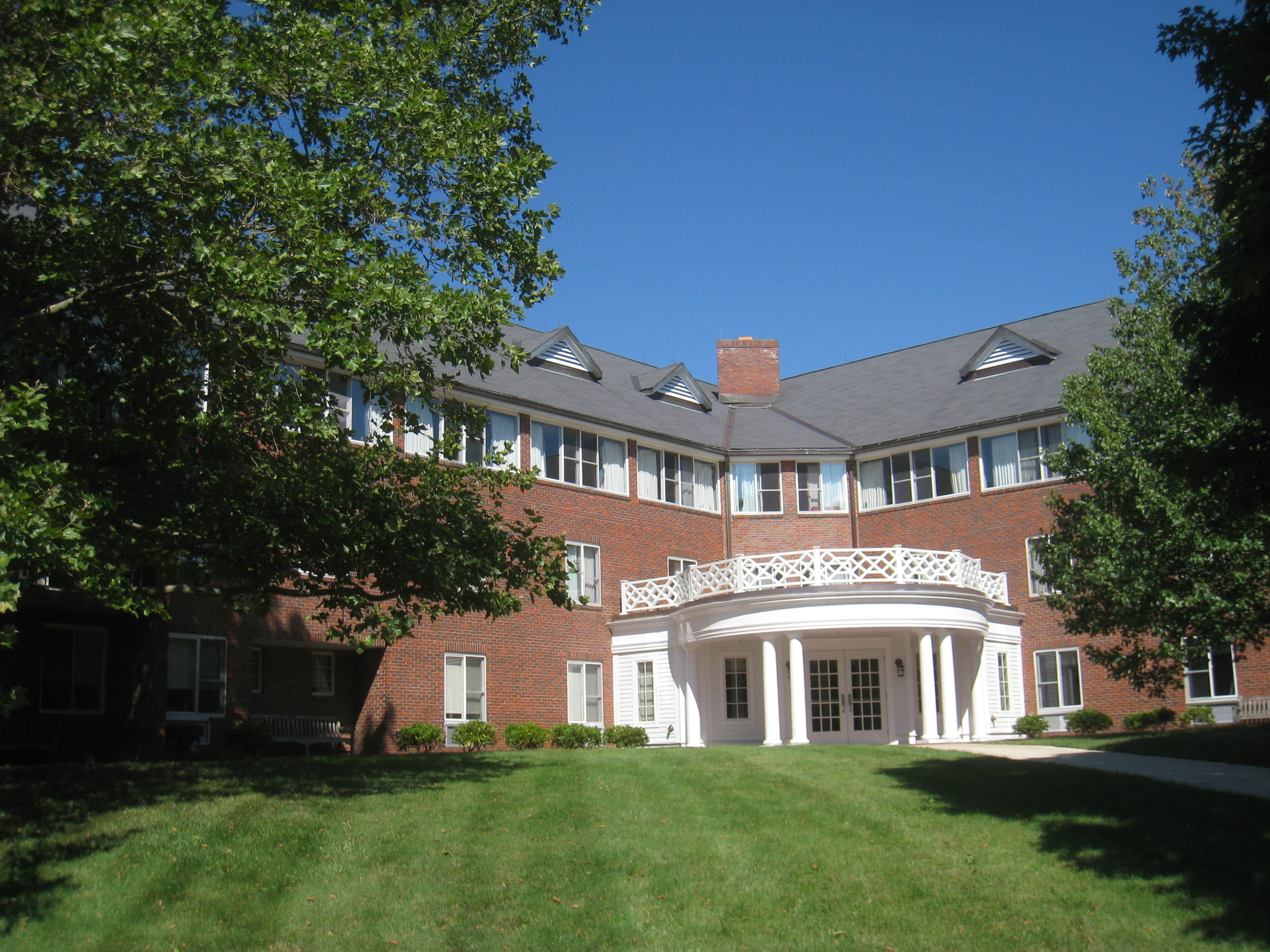
Steward Dormitory

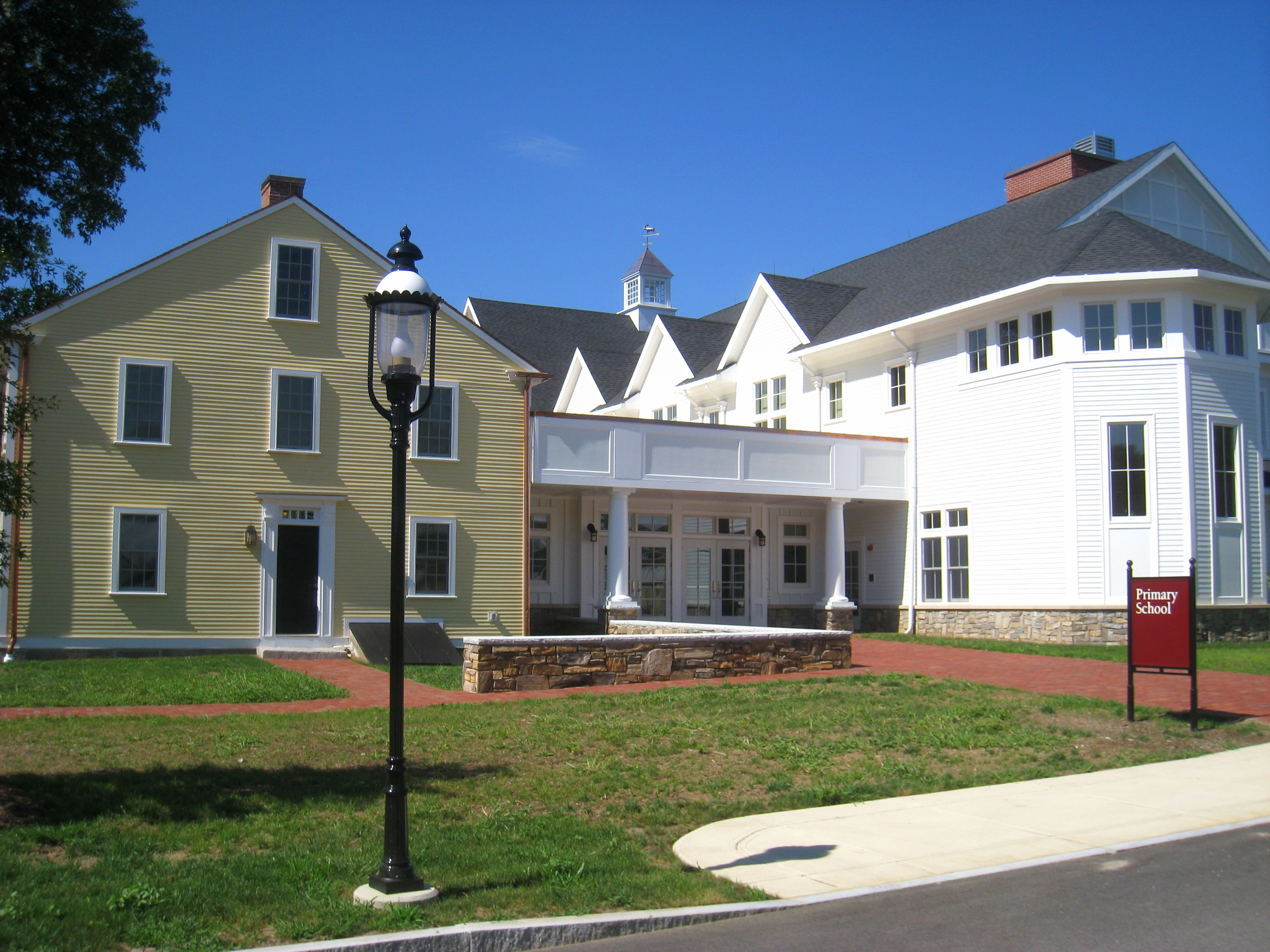
Primary Building

== Notable alumni ==
- Doug Brown '1979, NHL right winger, 1986-2001
- Stephen Chao '1970, entrepreneur and media executive, former president of Fox Television, 1992; former president of USA Network, 1998-2001
- Victor Chapman '1903, first American pilot killed in World War I
- Eric Chou '2010, Mandopop singer, songwriter
- Michael D. Coe '1941, archeologist, Mesoamerican scholar
- Robert Daniel '1949, US Representative of Virginia, 1973-1983
- Tarah Donoghue Breed '1997, deputy press secretary to First Lady Laura Bush
- Hamilton Fish III '1900, US Representative of New York, 1920-1945
- Peter Fonda '1954, actor
- George Foreman III '1998, boxer and entrepreneur
- Glen Foster '1944, 1972 Summer Olympics sailing medalist
- Topher Grace '1994, actor
- C. Boyden Gray '1956, White House counsel, 1989-1993, US Ambassador to the European Union, 2006-2008
- Prince Hashim Al Hussein '1996, prince of Jordan
- Princess Iman bint Hussein '1998, princess of Jordan
- Heyward Isham '1940, US Ambassador to Haiti, 1974-1977
- James Simon Kunen '1962, journalist, lawyer, writer, author of The Strawberry Statement
- Bruce Lawrence '1955, scholar, Duke professor of religion
- David McKean '1972, US Ambassador to Luxembourg, 2016-2017
- Nicholas Negroponte '1958, founder and chairman emeritus of the MIT Media Lab, founder of One Laptop per Child
- Robert E. Sherwood '1909, four-time Pulitzer Prize-winning playwright
- James Jeremiah Wadsworth '1918, US Ambassador to the United Nations, 1960-1961
- Damian Woetzel '1981, principal dancer at the New York City Ballet, 1989–2008; seventh president of the Juilliard School
- Ying Rudi '2014, professional KHL ice hockey player, Chinese representative in the 2022 Winter Olympics
- Efrem Zimbalist Jr. '1931, Golden Globe-winning actor
- Nika Futterman ''1985’, American Voice Actress and singer
