= Death and state funeral of Hussein of Jordan =

Death and State Funeral of the King of Jordan

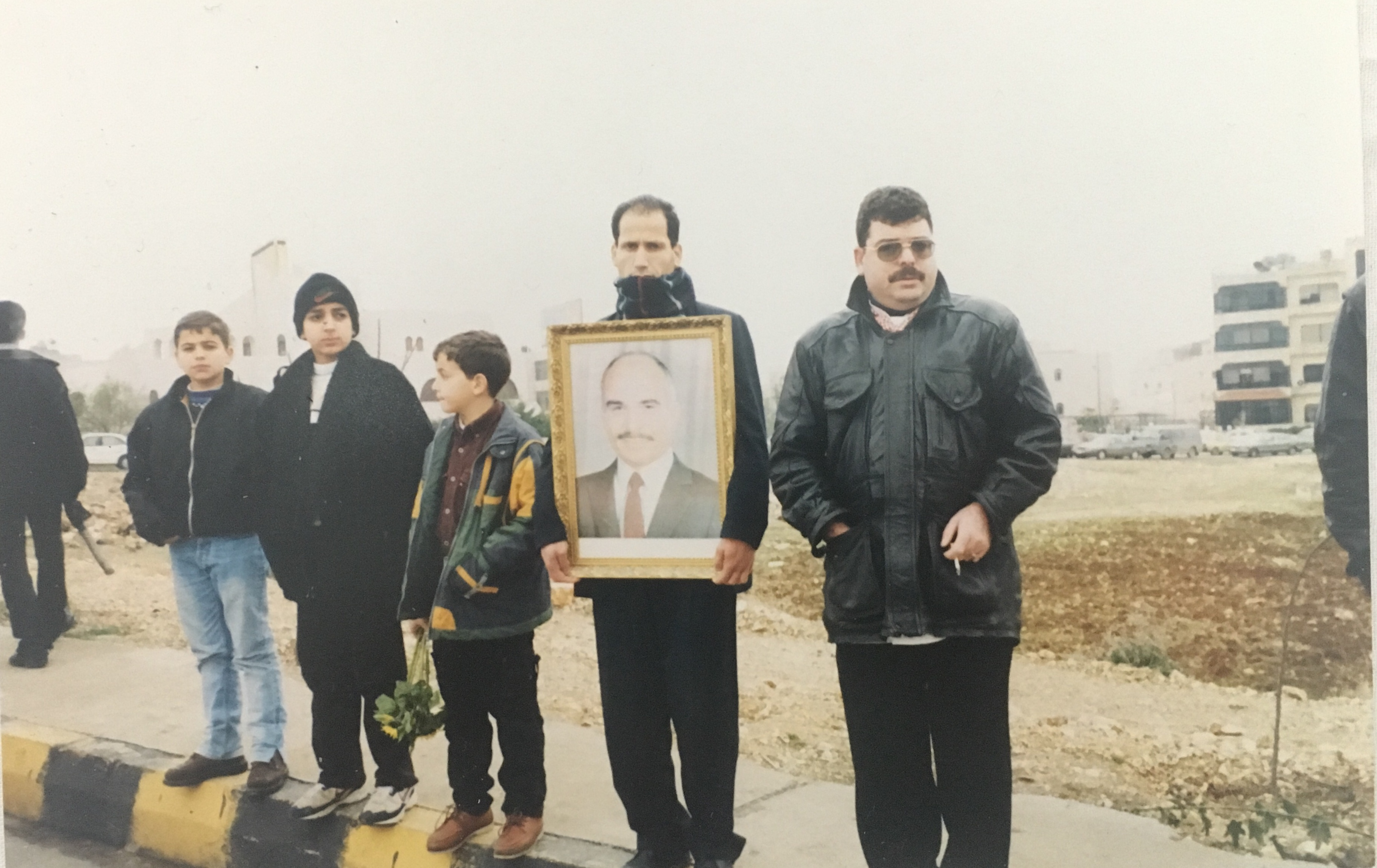
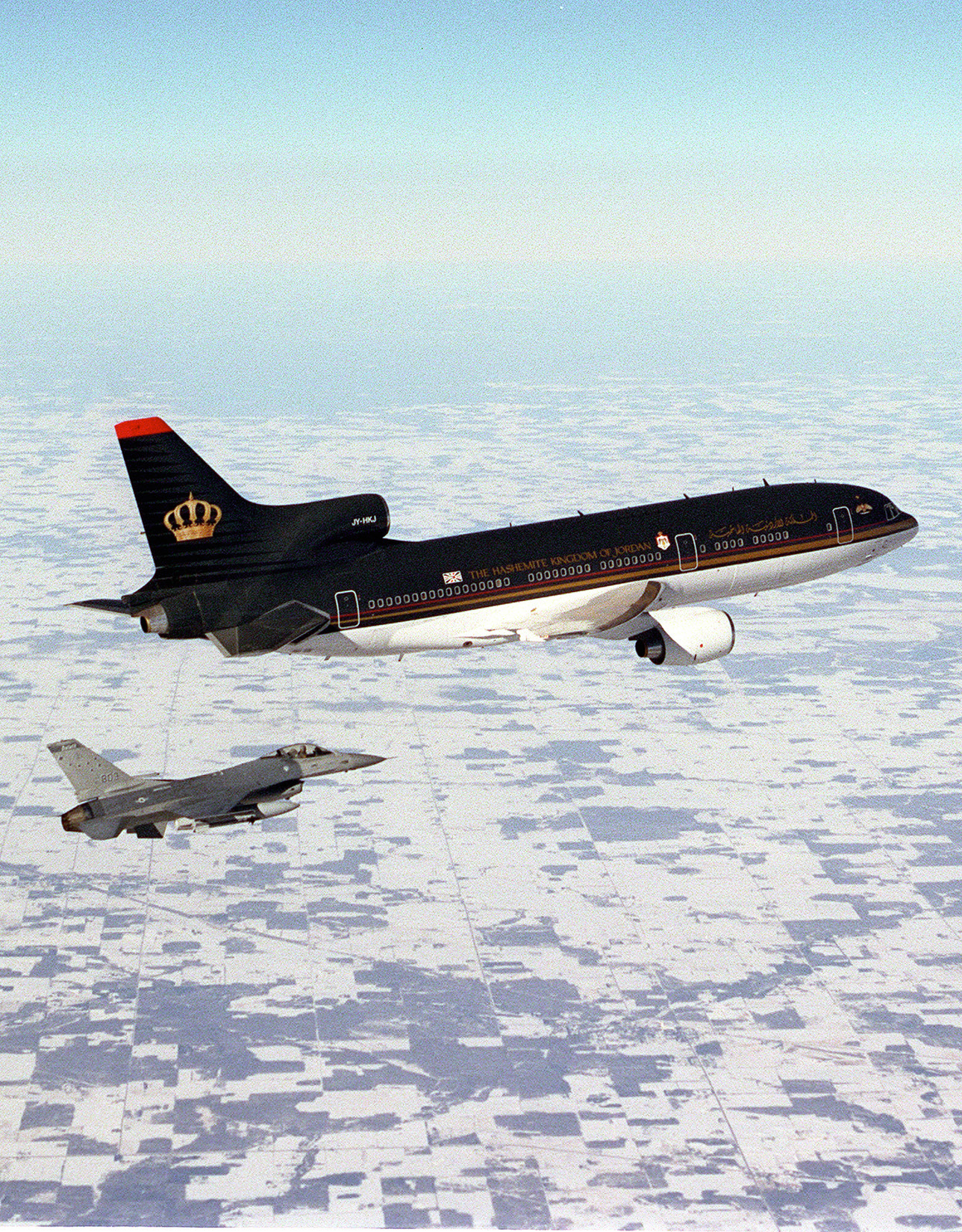
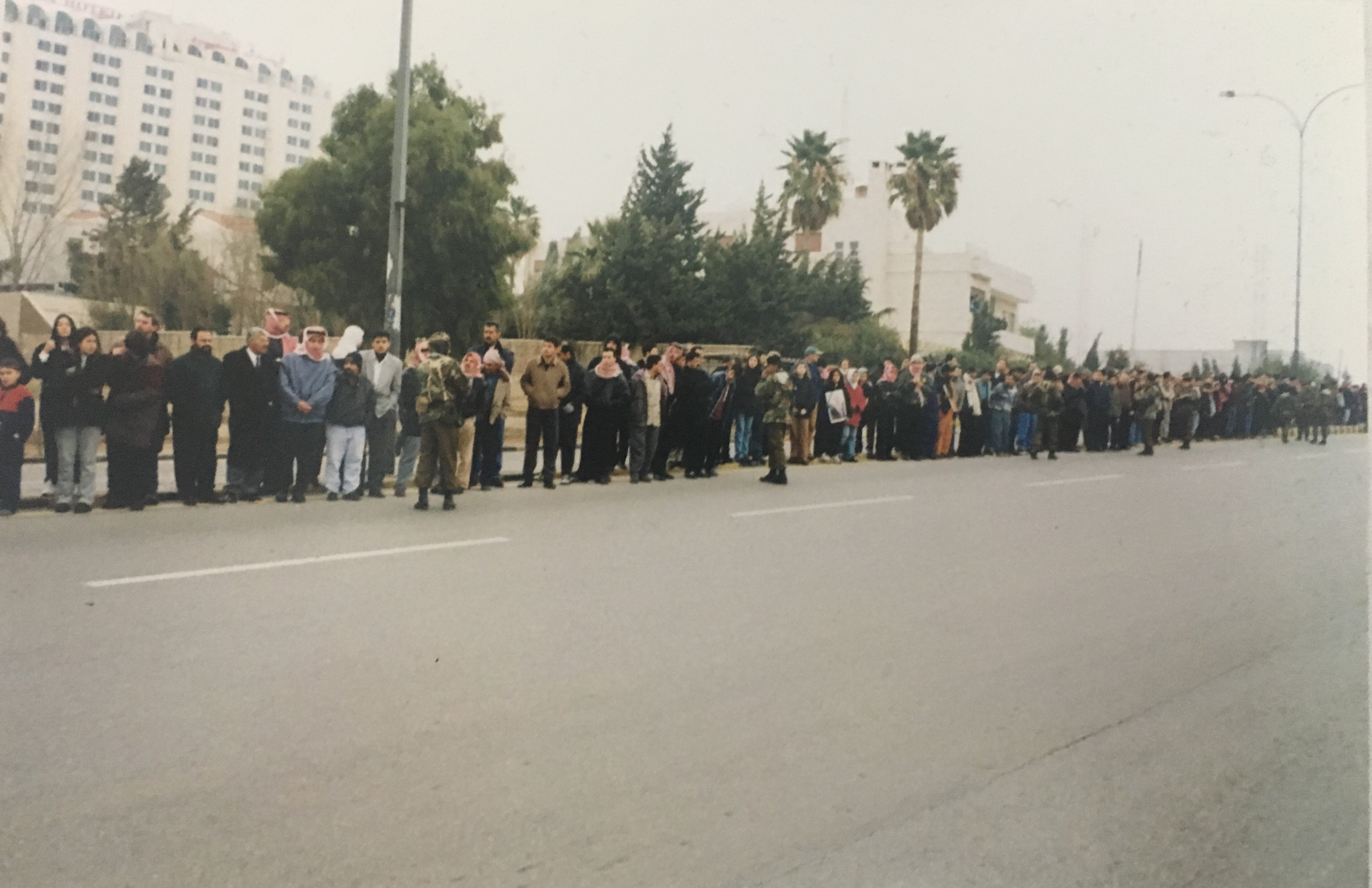
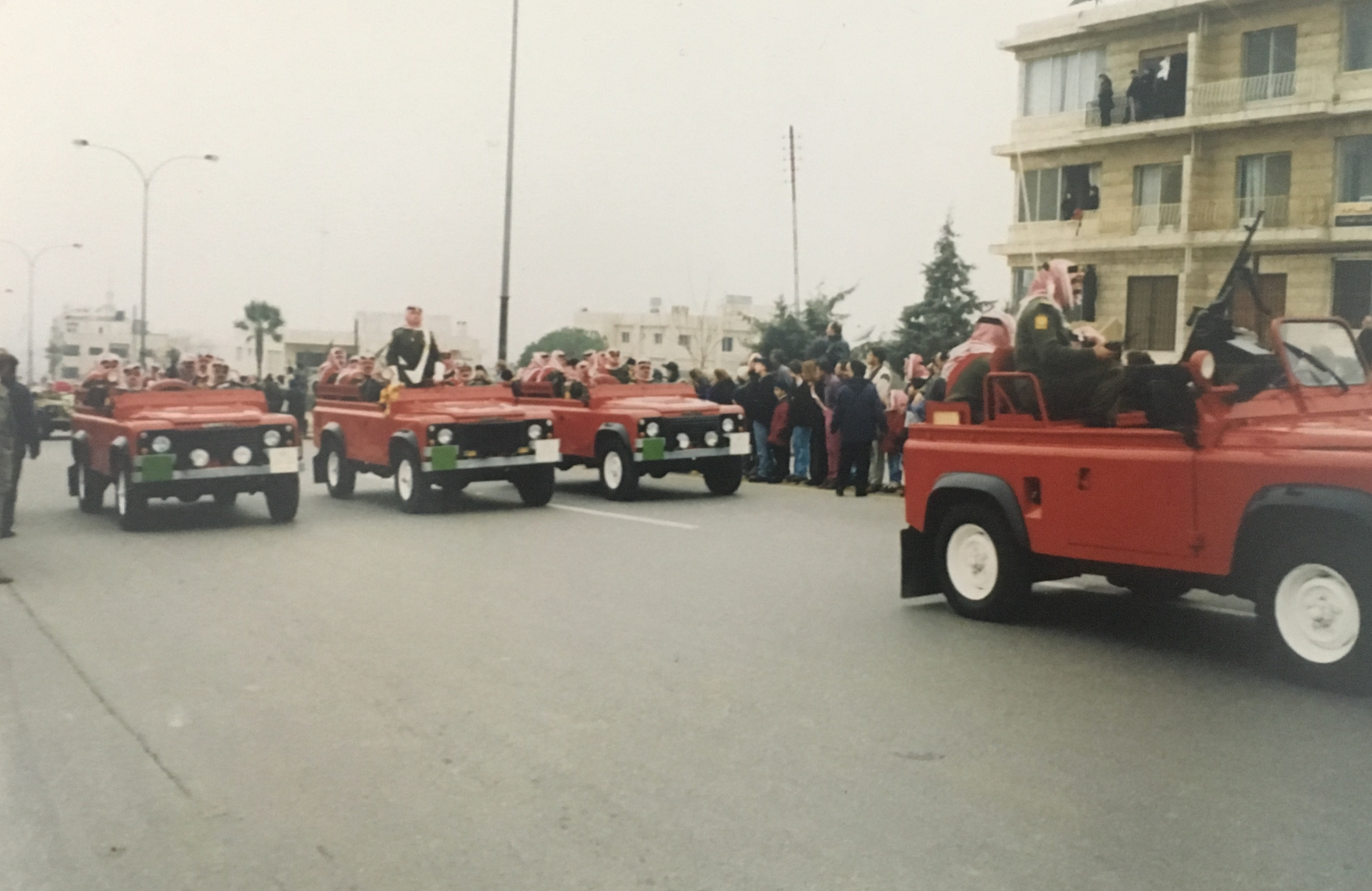
- Top to bottom, left to right: 1. Mourners on Zahran street hold up portrait of King Hussein; 2. Royal Jordanian 1 is escorted on 4 February 1999 by an F-16 of the Minnesota Air National Guard during King Hussein's return to Jordan. He died 3 days later 3. Crowds of people waiting for royal motorcade carrying King Hussein's coffin 4. Mourners line up along Zahran street in Amman on 8 February 1999 as royal motorcade transports King's coffin
- Date: 7 February 1999, at 11:43 (AST) (death); 8 February 1999 (state funeral and interment)
- Location: King Hussein Medical Center, Amman (death); Raghadan Palace, Amman (funeral)

Hussein, King of Jordan, died on 7 February 1999 at the King Hussein Medical Center in Amman, at the age of 63, after reigning for over four decades. He was succeeded by his eldest son, Abdullah, and his state funeral took place in Amman the following day.

== Background ==
It was made public that King Hussein was diagnosed with lymphatic cancer at the Mayo Clinic Hospital in Rochester, Minnesota in July 1998. Hussein's lymphoma was of a type that responded to chemotherapy, which the King had already begun and his physicians were optimistic he could be cured.

On his way back to Jordan in January 1999 after six months of treatment in the US, Hussein stopped in London. Doctors advised him to rest and stay in England for a few weeks, as he was still too fragile to travel. According to Jordanian government sources, Hussein stated that:

"I need very much to feel the warmth of my people around me; there is work to be done and I will get the strength from my people to finish the business."

== Final days and death ==
On 25 January 1999, only six days after returning to Jordan, Hussein relapsed and was rushed back to the Mayo Clinic for a second bone marrow transplant. He failed to recover, and suffered internal organ failure. On 4 February, with his condition deemed critical and the royal family opting for him to die in his country, he was flown back to Jordan and was then immediately taken by helicopter to an intensive care unit at the King Hussein Medical Center. Hussein was later reported to be in a coma and on a life support machine, and members of his family were reported to be gathering by his bedside.

By 5 February, Hussein was clinically dead and state television began broadcasting footage of the king's life and verses from the Quran. According to a royal court official, Hussein was "in agony" and "being kept alive by artificial means. There is no more hope."

King Hussein's heart stopped on 7 February 1999 at 11:43 am. Queen Noor and four of his five sons were at his side. His eldest son, Abdullah, who was named Crown Prince on 24 January, was called to the hospital and, after his arrival, the king was removed from the respirator and pronounced dead at 11:50, with the cause of death being given as heart failure. Hussein was the longest-serving executive head of state in the world.

The Jordanian cabinet released a statement officially announcing the king's death, which was read out on state television. Abdullah then addressed the nation in a televised speech. An emergency session of parliament was held so that Abdullah could take the oath of office as king.

== State funeral ==
The flag-draped coffin carrying the body of King Hussein was taken on a 90-minute procession through the streets of the capital city of Amman, accompanied by honor guard troops wearing keffiyeh. An estimated 800,000 Jordanians, many of them weeping, braved chilly winds to bid their leader farewell. Riot police were stationed along the nine-mile-long route to try to hold back the crowds who scrambled for a glimpse of the coffin.

Upon arrival at Raghadan Palace, the new king, Hussein's eldest son, Abdullah II, and the royal princes formally received the coffin. Queen Noor stood in a doorway surrounded by other royal women and watched from the gates of the cemetery as the king was buried.

== Dignitaries ==
Hundreds of dignitaries attended the funeral in the largest gathering of world leaders since the 1995 funeral of Israeli prime minister Yitzhak Rabin. At least 60 heads of state and government and 15 former leaders attended, as well as about 100 governmental representatives and some multilateral leaders. In all, six organizations and more than 120 countries were represented. Hamas sent a delegation of several representatives, led by its leader, Khalid Meshaal. United Nations Secretary-General Kofi Annan, his wife Nane Maria Annan and UNESCO Director General Koichiro Matsuura attended the funeral along with many of their colleagues such as the European Commission's Jacques Santer, NATO's Javier Solana, the IMF's Michel Camdessus and the African Union's Salim Ahmed Salim. Israeli prime minister Benjamin Netanyahu led the country's delegation, including Chief Rabbi Yesrael Lau and a representative of the families of seven teenage girls killed by a Jordanian soldier in 1997.

The funeral also brought together enemies, including the leader of the Democratic Front for the Liberation of Palestine, Nayef Hawatmeh, who approached Israeli president Ezer Weizman, praised him as a man of peace and shook his hand. It was the first time that Syrian president Hafez al-Assad and Netanyahu were together in the same place, though they did not meet.

=== Foreign royalty ===
==== Members of reigning royal families ====
- The Emir of Bahrain
- Sheikh Khalifa bin Salman Al Khalifa, Prime Minister of Bahrain
- (Belgium) The King of the Belgians
- The Sultan and Queen of Brunei
  - The Crown Prince of Brunei
- The Prince Consort of Denmark (representing the Queen of Denmark)
- The Crown Prince and Crown Princess of Japan (representing the Emperor of Japan)
- Sheikh Saad Al-Salim Al-Sabah, Crown Prince and Prime Minister of Kuwait
- The Grand Duke and Grand Duchess of Luxembourg
- The Crown Prince of Morocco (representing the King of Morocco)
- The Queen of the Netherlands
- The King of Norway
- The Sultan of Oman
- The Crown Prince of Qatar (representing the Emir of Qatar)
- The Crown Prince of Saudi Arabia (representing the King of Saudi Arabia)
  - The Prince Saud bin Faisal Al Saud, Minister of Foreign Affairs of Saudi Arabia
  - (Saudi Arabia) The Prince Abdulaziz bin Abdullah Al Saud
- The King and Queen of Spain
  - (Spain) The Prince of Asturias
  - (Spain) Infanta Elena, Duchess of Lugo
  - (Spain) Infanta Cristina, Duchess of Palma de Mallorca
- The King and Queen of Sweden
  - The Crown Princess of Sweden
- Sheikh Mohamed bin Zayed Al Nahyan of Abu Dhabi (representing the Emir of Abu Dhabi and President of United Arab Emirates)
  - The Crown Prince of Dubai and Minister of Defence of the United Arab Emirates
  - (United Arab Emirates) Sheikh Abdullah bin Zayed Al Nahyan, Minister of Information and Culture
- The Prince of Wales (representing the Queen of United Kingdom)

==== Members of non-reigning royal families ====
- Prince Ermias Sahle Selassie of Ethiopia
- King Constantine II and Queen Anne-Marie of Greece
  - The Princess Irene of Greece and Denmark
  - Crown Prince Pavlos and Crown Princess Marie-Chantal of Greece
  - Princess Alexia of Greece
  - The Prince Nikolaos of Greece and Denmark
- The Prince of Naples
- Alexander, Crown Prince of Yugoslavia

=== Other dignitaries ===
- Ahmed Asmat Abdel-Megid, Secretary General of the Arab League
- Liamine Zéroual, President of Algeria
  - El Ghouti Mekamcha, Minister of Justice of Algeria
- Vartan Oskanian, Minister of Foreign Affairs of Armenia
- Thomas Klestil, President of Austria
- Guy Verhofstadt, Member of the Chamber of Representatives of Belgium
- Haris Silajdžić, Co-chairman of the Council of Ministers of Bosnia and Herzegovina
- Veselin Metodiev, Deputy Prime Minister and Minister of Education and Science of Bulgaria
- Zhu Rongji, Premier of China
- Glafcos Klerides, President of Cyprus
  - Ioannis Kasoulidis, Minister of Foreign Affairs of Cyprus
- Václav Havel, President of Czech Republic
- Poul Nyrup Rasmussen, Prime Minister of Denmark
- Hosni Mubarak, President of Egypt
  - Kamal Ganzouri, Prime Minister of Egypt
- Arnold Rüütel, member of the Estonian Riigikogu and leader of the People's Union of Estonia
- Negasso Gidada, President of Ethiopia
- Martti Ahtisaari, President of Finland, and First Lady Eeva Ahtisaari
- Jacques Chirac, President of France, and First Lady Bernadette Chirac
- Gerhard Schröder, Chancellor of Germany
- Konstantinos Stephanopoulos, President of Greece
- Davíð Oddsson, Prime Minister of Iceland
- Krishan Kant, Vice President of India
- Mohammad Khatami, President of Iran
- (Ba'athist Iraq) Taha Marouf, Vice President of Iraq
- (Republic of Ireland) Mary McAleese, President of Ireland
  - (Republic of Ireland) Michael Woods, Minister for the Marine and Natural Resources of Ireland
- Ezer Weizman, President of Israel
  - Benjamin Netanyahu, Prime Minister of Israel
  - (Israel) Shimon Peres, Yitzhak Shamir, Leah Rabin, Ariel Sharon, Ehud Barak, Yitzhak Mordechai, Efraim Halevy, Salah Tarif, Sheikh Mowafak Tarif, Yisrael Meir Lau, Taleb el-Sana, Abdulmalik Dehamshe and Ahmad Tibi
- Oscar Luigi Scalfaro, President of Italy
- Keizō Obuchi, Prime Minister of Japan
- Sheikh Nawaf Al-Ahmad Al-Jaber Al-Sabah, Deputy Chief of Kuwait National Guards of Kuwait
- Michel Murr, Interior Minister of Lebanon
- Otmar Hasler, Member of the Landtag of Liechtenstein for Unterland of Liechtenstein
- Jacques Poos, Deputy Prime Minister and Minister for Foreign Affairs of Luxembourg
- (History of Libya under Muammar Gaddafi) Al-Saadi Gaddafi, Secretary-General of the General People's Congress of Libya
- Mahathir Mohamad, Prime Minister of Malaysia
- Guido de Marco, President of Malta
- Cheikh El Avia Ould Mohamed Khouna, Prime Minister of Mauritania
- Wim Kok, Prime Minister of the Netherlands
  - (Netherlands) Hans van den Broek, European Commissioner
- Abdulsalami Abubakar, Head of State and Minister of Defence of Nigeria
- (North Korea) Kim Yong-nam, President of the Presidium of the Supreme People's Assembly
- Yusuf bin Alawi, Minister Responsible for Foreign Affairs of Oman
- Badr bin Saud, Minister Responsible for Defence of Oman
- (Palestine) Yasser Arafat, President of the Palestinian National Authority
  - (Palestine) Khaled Mashal, 2nd Chairman of the Hamas Political Bureau
  - (Palestine) Mahmoud Abbas, Palestinian Politician
  - (Palestine) Ahmed Qurei, Speaker of the Palestinian Legislative Council
  - (Palestine) Yasser Abed Rabbo, Secretary-General of Palestinian Democratic Union
  - (Palestine) Faruq al-Qaddumi, Head of the PLO's political department
  - (Palestine) Nabil Shaath, Minister of Planning and International Cooperation
  - (Palestine) Hakam Balawi, Palestinian Politician
  - (Palestine) Nayef Hawatmeh, Palestinian Politician
- Nawaz Sharif, Prime Minister of Pakistan
  - Sartaj Aziz, Minister for Foreign Affairs of Pakistan
- Bronisław Geremek, Minister of Foreign Affairs of Poland
- Jorge Sampaio, President of Portugal
- Emil Constantinescu, President of Romania
  - Andrei Pleșu, Minister of Foreign Affairs of Romania
- Boris Yeltsin, President of Russia
  - Igor Ivanov, Minister of Foreign Affairs of Russia
- Paul Kagame, Vice President of Rwanda
- Ibrahim Al-Assaf, Minister of Finance of Saudi Arabia
- Goh Chok Tong, Prime Minister of Singapore
- Milan Kučan, President of Slovenia
- Nelson Mandela, President of South Africa
  - Mangosuthu Buthelezi, Minister of Home Affairs of South Africa
- Kim Jong-pil, Prime Minister of South Korea
- José María Aznar, Prime Minister of Spain
- Omar al-Bashir, President of Sudan
  - Mustafa Osman, Ministry of Foreign Affairs of Sudan
  - Lam Akol, Transport Minister of Sudan
  - (Sudan) Ghazi Al Atabani, and Swar Al Dahab
- Carl Bildt, Leader of the Opposition of Sweden
- Adolf Ogi, President of Switzerland
- (Ba'athist Syria) Hafez al-Assad, President of Syria
  - (Ba'athist Syria) Abdul Halim Khaddam, Vice President of Syria
  - (Ba'athist Syria) Farouk al-Sharaa, Minister of Foreign Affairs of Syria
- Jason Hu, Minister of Foreign Affairs of Taiwan
- Hamed Karoui, Prime Minister of Tunisia
- Süleyman Demirel, President of Turkey
  - İsmail Cem, Minister of Foreign Affairs of Turkey
- Leonid Kuchma, President of Ukraine
- Minister of Finance and Industry of United Arab Emirates
- Tony Blair, Prime Minister of United Kingdom
  - (United Kingdom) John Major, Former prime minister, UK
  - (United Kingdom) Margaret Thatcher, Former prime minister, UK
  - (United Kingdom) William Hague, Leader of the Opposition
  - (United Kingdom) Paddy Ashdown, Leader of the Liberal Democrats
- Bill Clinton, President of the United States
  - (United States) Gerald Ford, Former president, US
  - (United States) Jimmy Carter, Former president, US
  - (United States) George H. W. Bush, Former president, US
  - (United States) Ben Gilman, Chair of the House International Relations Committee
  - (United States) David Bonior, House Minority Whip
  - Ted Stevens, United States senator from Alaska
  - Patrick Leahy, United States senator from Vermont
  - Sandy Berger, United States national security advisor
  - (United States) Dennis Ross, American diplomat
  - (United States) Thomas Pickering, under secretary of state for political affairs
  - (United States) Martin Indyk, assistant secretary of state for Near Eastern affairs
  - (United States) Najeeb Halaby, Father of Queen Noor of Jordan (the king's father-in-law)
- Ali Abdullah Saleh, President of Yemen
- (Serbia and Montenegro) Momir Bulatović, Prime Minister of Yugoslavia
- James Wolfensohn, President of the World Bank
- Mohammed Khalfan Bin Kharbash
- Aga Khan IV

A controversial absence from the funeral was that of Canadian prime minister Jean Chrétien. Chrétien, who was on a ski vacation, said that the short notice of the funeral made it impossible for him to attend. This decision was criticized, since the news of Hussein's health was well known.

Women dignitaries who were not heads of state were barred from attending the funeral itself; Queen Sofía of Spain only discovered that she could not attend upon her arrival. Madeleine Albright, the US Secretary of State, also did not attend.

== Reactions and tributes ==
In response to Hussein's death, the governments of Jordan, India, Egypt, Algeria, Kuwait, United Arab Emirates, Oman, Palestine, Yemen, and Syria declared periods of official mourning and flew their flags at half mast.

Many world leaders expressed their condolences. United States president Bill Clinton said, "He won the respect and admiration of the entire world and so did his beloved Jordan. He is a man who believed that we are all God's children, bound to live together in mutual respect and tolerance." UK prime minister Tony Blair called Hussein "an extraordinary and immensely charismatic persuader for peace." Israeli prime minister Benjamin Netanyahu said, "With great sadness we bid farewell to you, king and friend. The peace between our peoples will be a testament to your abiding belief in a lasting peace between the sons of Abraham. Rest in peace, your majesty." The Cypriot President Glafcos Clerides described him as "a leader of international prestige, who contributed greatly to all efforts towards finding a solution to the Middle East problem. He was an exceptional figure, who spoke his mind and dealt with matters in such a way that Jordan, despite its many enemies, managed to survive as an independent state. He also contributed greatly to preventing war in the region." Russian president Boris Yeltsin said Hussein was "invaluable to the formation of a new image of the Middle East, free of stereotypes of confrontation and enmity". Greek president Konstantinos Stephanopoulos and Prime Minister Costas Simitis commended Hussein for having brought his country internal political stability and increased international respect. German chancellor Gerhard Schröder expressed similar sentiments.

The United Nations General Assembly held a session in tribute to Hussein on the day of the funeral, as it has done for heads of state who died in office. General Assembly President Didier Oppertti and the various heads of the United Nations Regional Groups spoke at the session. Individual representatives from the USA, Israel, Egypt, Russia, Palestine, and Jordan also spoke on behalf of their own nations.
