= Leap of Faith: Memoirs of an Unexpected Life =

2003 book by Noor van Jordanië

- Cover from the paperback version of the book
- Author: Queen Noor of Jordan
- Language: English
- Subject: Queen Noor of Jordan, King Hussein of Jordan and the Middle East
- Genre: Biography
- Publisher: Miramax Books
- Publication date: 2003
- ISBN: 0-7868-6717-5
- OCLC: 700303086
- Dewey Decimal: 956.9504/4/092 B 22
- LC Class: DS154.52.N87 A3 2003a

Leap of Faith: Memoirs of an Unexpected Life (2003) is a book written by Queen Noor of Jordan, wife of the late Jordanian King Hussein I. The book recounts Queen Noor's early life, her marriage to her husband, and her subsequent actions as the Queen of Jordan. The book was generally well-received by critics.

== Dedication and epigraph ==
The book is dedicated, "For my beloved Hussein, light of my life." The book's epigraph is the quotation, provided without attribution: "Work for life on this earth as if you are to live forever, and work for the life after in heaven as if you are to die tomorrow." It is a popular quotation in the Muslim world, although its origins are disputed.

In Sunni tradition, al-Bayhaqi recorded it as a hadith uttered by Muhammad and transmitted through Abd Allah ibn Amr ibn al-As. A similar report was given by al-Daylami, although al Haythami recorded it as a statement of Abd Allah ibn Amr ibn al-As himself. Al-Suyuti and Al-Munawi classed the hadith as ḍa'īf (weak) due to defects in the chain of transmission. Martin Ling stated that Ali originated the phrase to summarize Muhammad's guidance for life. In Shia tradition, the quotation is attributed to either Muhammad (as recorded in Tanbih al-Khawatir), or to Musa al-Kazim (as recorded in Man La Yahduruhu al-Faqih). While directly attributing the quotation to Muhammad may be controversial, it circulates widely in the Muslim world and remains a common saying.

== Summary ==
The book begins by describing Queen Noor's first meeting with her future husband, then backtracks to her youth growing up in the United States. After graduating with Princeton University's first co-ed class, the future Queen Noor began her professional career, and after her initial meeting with King Hussein proceeded to strike up an acquaintance after consulting on the architecture of his residence.

Interspersed with descriptions of the blossoming romance, the memoir recounts episodes from Jordanian history, including the Six-Day War and Black September. The memoir describes King Hussein's frustrations with Jordan not being included in the negotiations prior to the Camp David Accords and about the rejection of Jordan by leaders of the First Intifada, while also documenting the growing royal family and the births of their children. Eventually, King Hussein is diagnosed with lymphoma, and after an initial period of remission learns that his cancer has recurred. Upon his final decline, King Hussein returns with his family so that he may die on Jordanian soil.

The book ends with an epilogue, containing Queen Noor's message of religious faith, and a year after publication was expanded with an afterword reflecting on how she hoped the personal story of her book would continue helping to bridge the gap between the Arab world and the West.

== Release and reception ==
Queen Noor was interviewed by Jeff Greenfield on Book TV to promote her memoir, and also made appearances on Good Morning America and Larry King Live. Speaking to CBS News, Queen Noor called her memoir "a book about building bridges" and said that she wrote the book to honor her husband's work for peace. She visited Madrid during the promotional tour for Leap of Faith. The author's royalties from the book's sales were to be donated to the King Hussein Foundation.

A review in Publishers Weekly predicted that "[a]nyone who loved The King and I will readily warm to the love story of Queen Noor and the late King Hussein of Jordan." Avi Shlaim, reviewing the book positively for The Guardian, called it "an intimate portrait of a marriage" which "reflects a deep commitment to the people, culture, and natural beauty of Jordan." Janet Maslin in The New York Times called the book "a glossy and decorous account" of Queen Noor's life which politely elides over personal details while simultaneously providing a "fiery account" of her late husband's frustrations with international diplomacy.
