= Tarah Donoghue =

Tarah Donoghue Breed is a US political PR professional who served as the Deputy Press Secretary to Laura Bush, First Lady of the United States from 2006 to 2007. Before she began her work in the First Lady's Office, Tarah worked for Vice President Dick Cheney.

== Biography ==
Breed attended Georgetown University for her undergraduate studies, where she received a degree in political science. She graduated from Fay School and St. Mark's School, both of Southborough, Massachusetts, in 2001, and also served as the 2009 Prize Day speaker there.

Donoghue joined the Washington, DC–based public relations firm of Gibraltar Associates on November 5, 2007, specializing in client communications strategy, policy and strategic messaging. In June 2009 she was hired as the Communications Director for the Massachusetts Republican Party.
