= Queen Noor of Jordan =

Queen of Jordan from 1978 to 1999

Noor Al Hussein
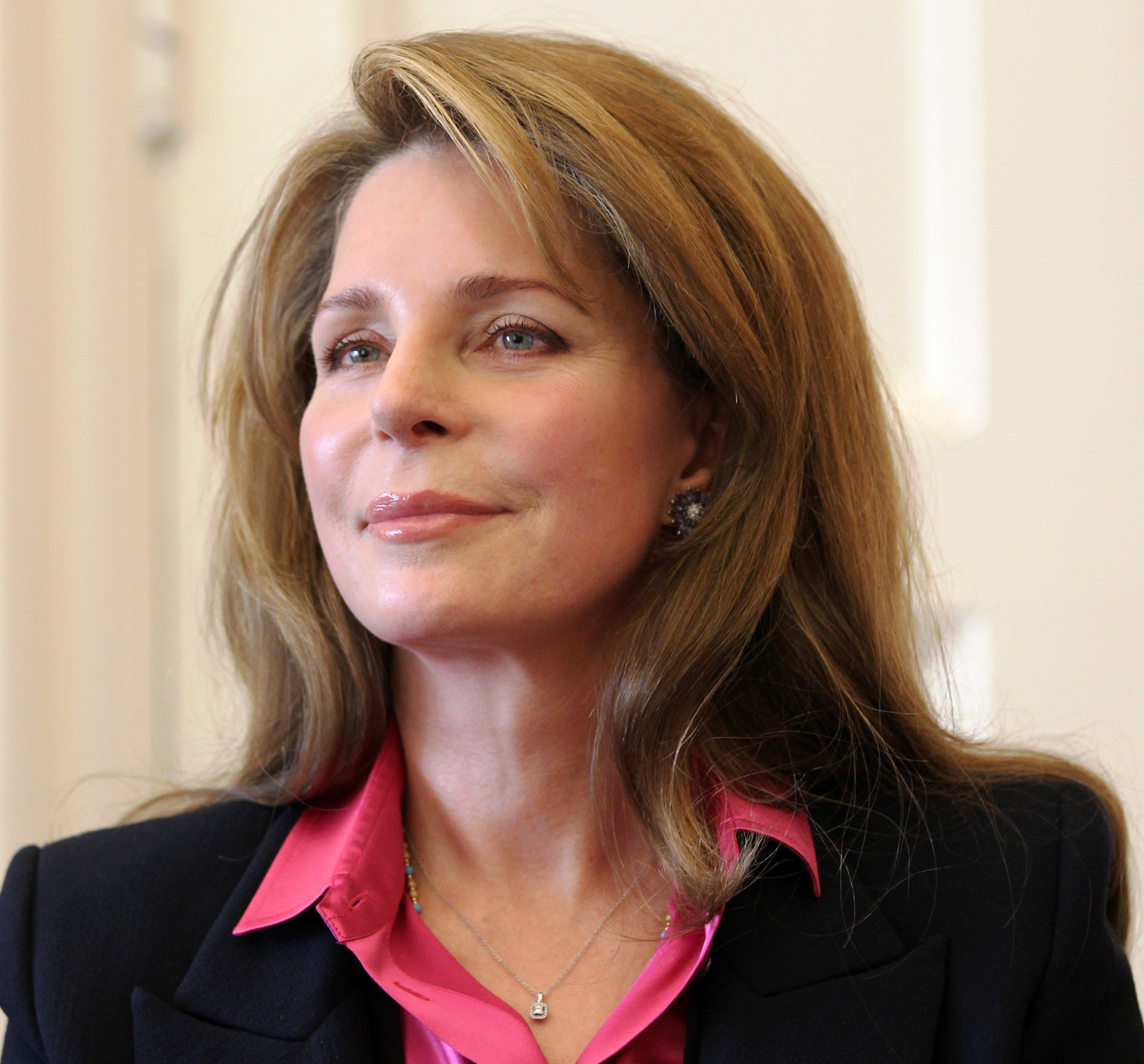
- Noor in 2011

Queen consort of Jordan
- Tenure: June 15, 1978 – February 7, 1999
- Born: Lisa Najeeb Halaby; August 23, 1951 (age 75); Washington, D.C., U.S.
- Spouse: Hussein of Jordan (m. 1978; died 1999)
- Issue: Hamzah bin Hussein; Prince Hashim; Princess Iman; Princess Raiyah
- Father: Najeeb Halaby
- Mother: Doris Carlquist
- Education: Princeton University (AB)

Noor Al Hussein (Arabic: نور الحسين; born Lisa Najeeb Halaby; August 23, 1951) is an American-born Jordanian philanthropist and activist who was the fourth wife and widow of King Hussein of Jordan. She was Queen of Jordan from their marriage on June 15, 1978, until Hussein's death on February 7, 1999.

Noor is the longest-standing member of the Board of Commissioners of the International Commission on Missing Persons. As of 2023, she is president of the United World Colleges movement and an advocate of the anti-nuclear weapons proliferation campaign Global Zero. In 2015, Queen Noor received Princeton University's Woodrow Wilson Award for her public service.

== Family and early life ==
Queen Noor was born Lisa Najeeb Halaby in Washington, D.C., the eldest child of Najeeb Halaby (1915–2003) and Doris Carlquist (1918–2015). Her paternal grandfather was Syrian; her maternal family is Swedish American. Her father was raised a Christian Scientist and was a Navy experimental test pilot, an airline executive, and government official. He served as an aide to the United States Secretary of Defense in the Truman administration, before being appointed by President John F. Kennedy to head the Federal Aviation Administration. Najeeb Halaby also had a private-sector career, as CEO of Pan American World Airways from 1969 to 1972. The Halabys had two more children after Lisa: a son, Christian, and a younger daughter, Alexa. The children were raised nominally Episcopalian. Najeeb and Doris divorced in 1977. Doris died on December 25, 2015, aged 97.

Noor's paternal grandfather was Najeeb Elias Halaby, a Syrian-Lebanese businessman born in Zahle, and whose parents hailed from Aleppo. He was a petroleum broker, according to 1920 Census records. Merchant Stanley Marcus recalled that in the mid-1920s, Halaby opened Halaby Galleries, a rug boutique and interior-decorating shop, at Neiman Marcus in Dallas, Texas, and ran it with his Texas-born wife, Laura Wilkins (1889–1987, later Mrs. Urban B. Koen). Najeeb Halaby died shortly afterward, and his estate was unable to continue the new enterprise.

According to research done in 2010 for the PBS series Faces of America by Professor Henry Louis Gates Jr., of Harvard University, her great-grandfather, Elias Halaby, came to New York circa 1891, one of the earliest Syrian-Lebanese immigrants to the United States. He was a Christian as well as having been a provincial treasurer (magistrate) as stated before by Najeeb Halaby in his autobiography Crosswinds: an Airman's Memoir. He left Ottoman Syria with his two eldest sons. His wife, Almas Mallouk, and their remaining children joined him in the United States in 1894. He died three years later, leaving his teenage sons, Habib, and Najeeb (her paternal grandfather), to run his import business. Najeeb moved to Dallas around 1910 and fully assimilated into U.S. society.

== Education ==
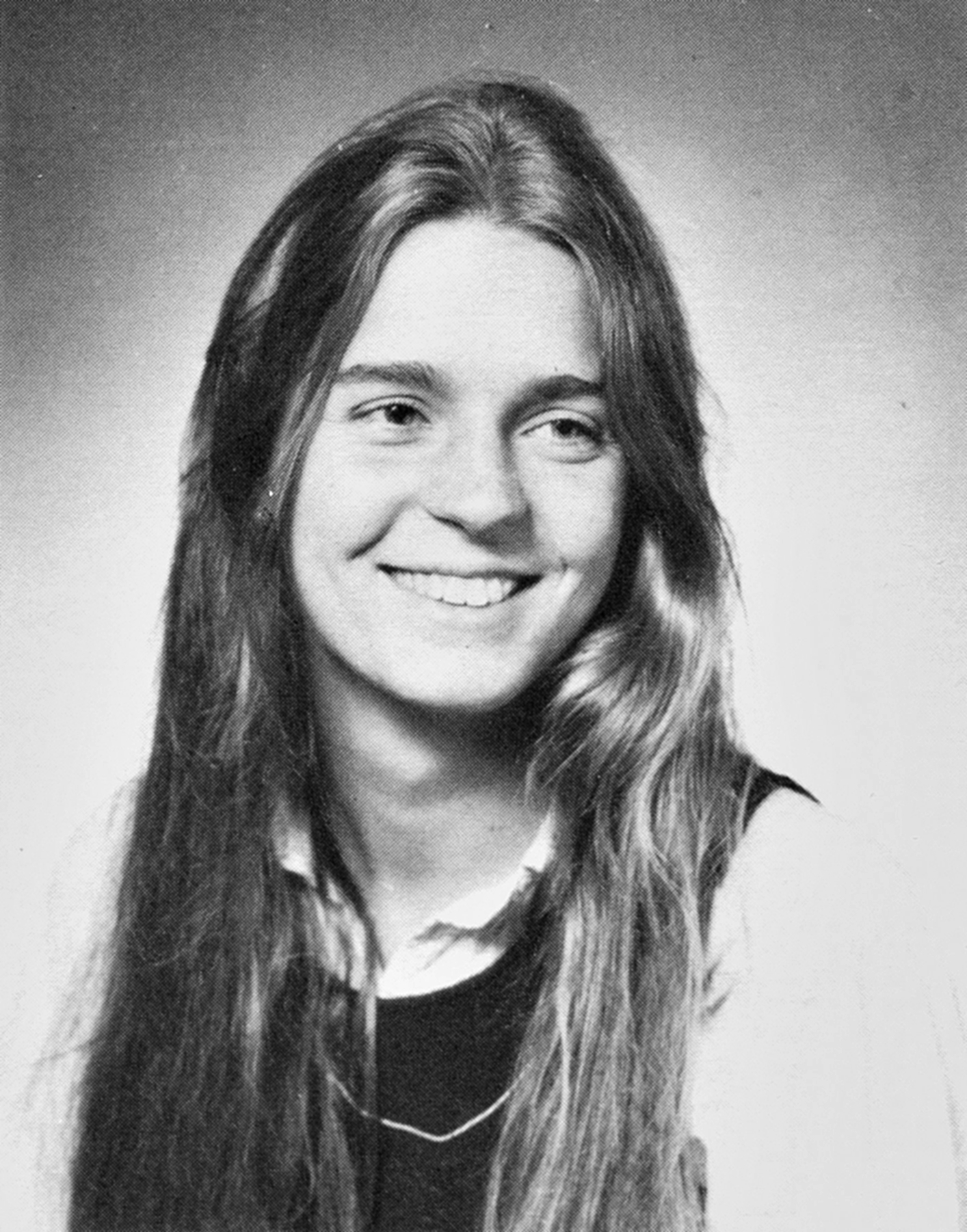
Halaby in the Princeton University yearbook, 1974

Halaby attended schools in New York and California before entering National Cathedral School in Washington, D.C. from fourth to eighth grade. She attended the Chapin School in New York City for two years, and then went on to graduate from Concord Academy.

She entered Princeton University with its first coeducational freshman class and received an A.B. in architecture and urban planning in 1974 after completing a 32-page long senior thesis titled "96th Street and Second Avenue." She was also a member of Princeton's first women's ice hockey team.

== Career ==
After she graduated from Princeton, Halaby moved to Australia, where she worked for a firm that specialized in planning new towns, with a burgeoning interest in West Asia. Because of Halaby's Syrian roots, this had special appeal for her. After a year, in 1975, she accepted a job offer from Llewelyn Davies, a British architectural and planning firm, which had been employed to design a model capital city center in Tehran, Iran. When increasing political instability forced the company to relocate to the UK, she traveled to the Arab world and decided to apply to Columbia University's Graduate School of Journalism while taking a temporary aviation facility research job in Amman. Eventually, she left Arab Air and accepted a job with Alia Airlines to become Director of Facilities Planning and Design. Halaby and the king became friends while he was still mourning the death of his third wife. Their friendship evolved and the couple became engaged in 1978.

== Marriage and children ==
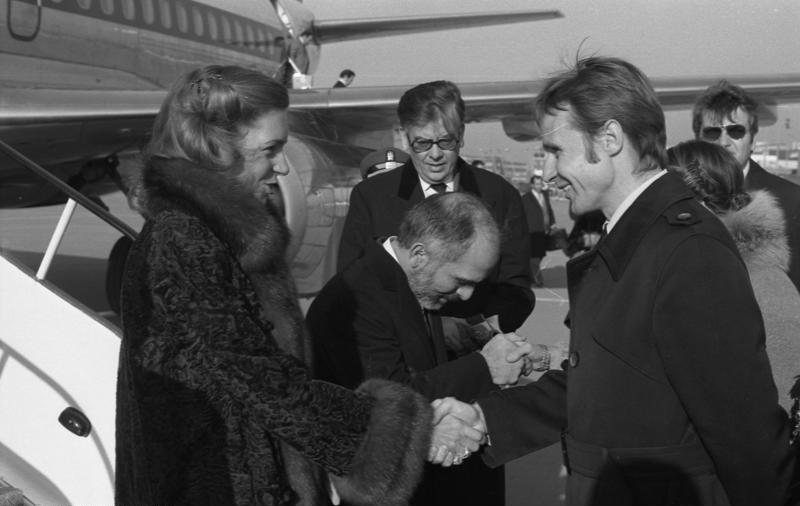
Queen Noor in Hamburg, West Germany, on a state visit with King Hussein, in 1978

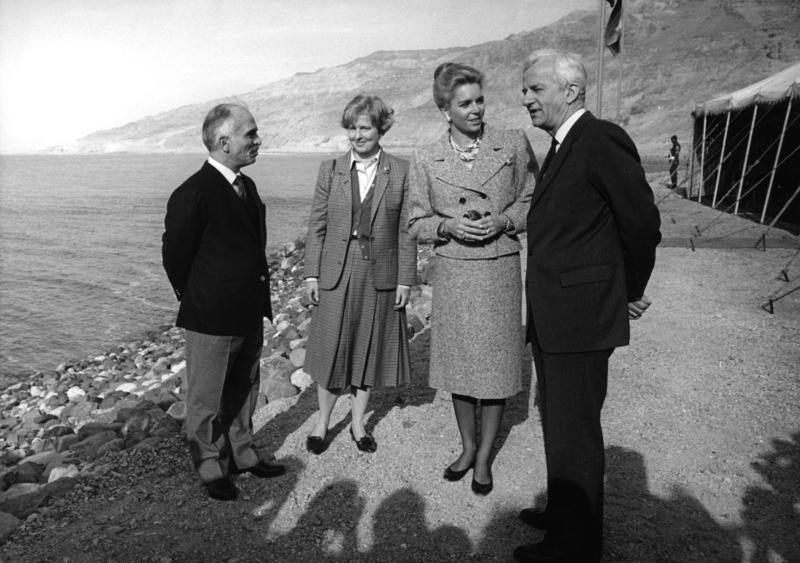
Queen Noor and King Hussein with Richard von Weizsäcker, President of West Germany, and First Lady Marianne von Weizsäcker in Jordan in 1985

Halaby wed King Hussein on June 15, 1978, in Amman, becoming Queen of Jordan.

Before her marriage, she accepted her husband's Sunni Islamic religion and upon the marriage, changed her name from Lisa Halaby to the royal name Noor Al Hussein ("Light of Hussein"). The wedding was a traditional Muslim ceremony. Noor assumed management of the royal household and three stepchildren, Princess Haya bint Al Hussein, Prince Ali bin Al Hussein and Abir Muhaisen (her husband's children by Queen Alia). Noor and Hussein had four children:

- Hamzah (born March 29, 1980, in King Hussein Medical Center, Amman), Crown Prince from 1999 to 2004, who has five daughters and two sons.
- Prince Hashim (born June 10, 1981, at King Hussein Medical Center in Amman), who has three daughters and two sons.
- Princess Iman (born April 24, 1983, at King Hussein Medical Center, Amman), who has one son.
- Princess Raiyah (born February 9, 1986, at King Hussein Medical Center in Amman).

== Areas of work ==
=== Domestic agenda ===
Queen Noor founded the King Hussein Foundation (KHF) in 1979. It includes the Noor Al Hussein Foundation and eight specialized development institutions: the Jubilee Institute, the Information and Research Center, the National Music Conservatory, the National Center for Culture and Arts and the Institute for Family Health, the Community Development Program, Tamweelcom the Jordan Micro Credit Company and the Islamic microfinance company, Ethmar. She is the Honorary Chairperson of JOrchestra. In addition, Queen Noor launched a youth initiative, the International Arab Youth Congress, in 1980.

=== International agenda ===
Queen Noor's international work focuses on environmental issues and the connection to human security with emphasis on water and ocean health. At the 2017 Our Ocean Conference, she delivered a keynote address on the link between climate change and ocean health with human security. Queen Noor is Patron of the International Union for Conservation of Nature, Founding and Emeritus President of BirdLife International, Trustee Emeritus of Conservation International, and an Ocean Elder. In 1993 she accompanied King Hussein to the opening of Challenge 93, the first international ex-service wheelchair games at Stoke Mandeville. She was also chair of King Hussein Foundation International, a US non-profit 501(c)(3) which, since 2001, has awarded the King Hussein Leadership Prize. She is the president of the international board, the governing board of international movement for the UWC movement.

She speaks Arabic, English and French.

== Widowhood ==
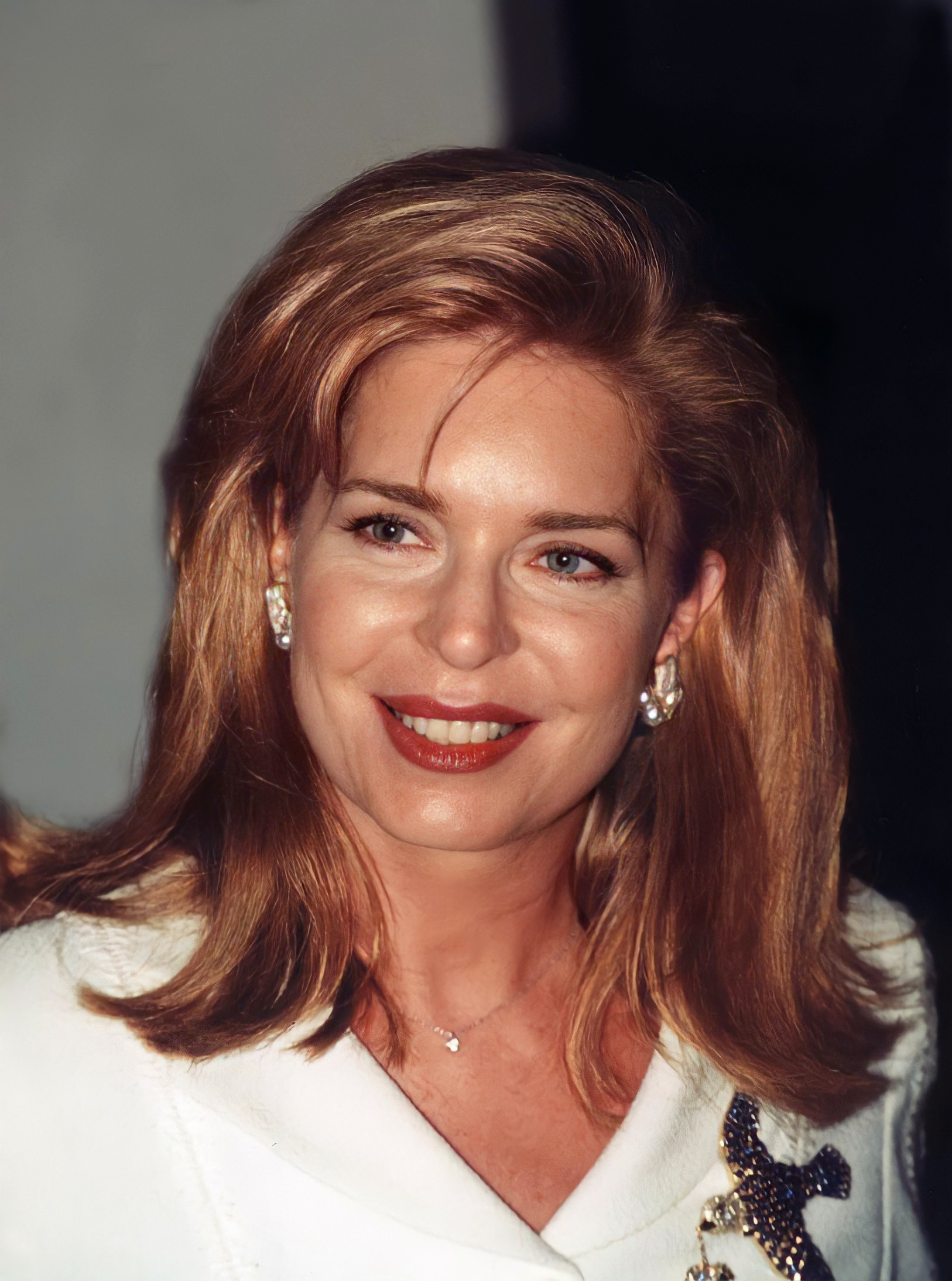
Queen Noor in September 1999

King Hussein died on February 7, 1999, from lymphatic cancer. After his death, his first-born son, Abdullah II, became king and Hamzah became crown prince. In 2004, Prince Hamzah was unexpectedly stripped of his status as heir designate. On July 2, 2009, Abdullah named his eldest son Prince Hussein as heir apparent to the throne, thereby ending the previous five years' speculation over his successor.

Noor divides her time among Jordan, the United States (Washington, D.C.) and the United Kingdom (in London and at her country residence, Buckhurst Park, near Winkfield in Berkshire). She continues to work on behalf of numerous international organizations. She also enjoys skiing, water skiing, tennis, sailing, horseback riding, reading, gardening and photography. She held amateur radio callsign JY1NH, but the license has lapsed.

== Honours ==
=== National honours ===
- Jordan:
  - Knight Grand Cordon with Collar of the Order of al-Hussein bin Ali
  - Knight of the Order of Military Glory
  - Knight Grand Cordon (Special Class) of the Supreme Order of the Renaissance
  - Knight Grand Cordon of the Order of the Star of Jordan

=== Foreign honours ===
Queen Noor's arms as dame of the Order of Charles III

- Austria:
  - Grand Star of the Order of Honour for Services to the Republic of Austria
- Brunei:
  - Member First Class of the Family Order of Laila Utama
- Denmark:
  - Knight of the Order of the Elephant (1998)
- Egypt:
  - Grand Cross Special Class of the Order of the Virtues
- France:
  - Grand Cross of the Order of the Legion of Honour
- Italy:
  - Knight Grand Cross of the Order of Merit of the Italian Republic
- Luxembourg:
  - Dame Grand Cross of the Order of the Gold Lion of the House of Nassau
- Spain:
  - Dame Grand Cross of the Order of Charles III
  - Dame Grand Cross of the Order of Isabella the Catholic
- Sweden:
  - Member of the Royal Order of the Seraphim
- United Kingdom:
  - Dame Grand Cross of the Order of Saint John

=== Awards ===
- 2001: Blessed are the Peacemakers Award from Catholic Theological Union

== Publications ==
- — (1 January 2000). Hussein of Jordan, 1935–1999: A Photographic History (in Arabic). King Hussein Foundation. ISBN 978-9957851903. OCLC 803766796.
- — (18 March 2003). Leap of Faith: Memoirs of an Unexpected Life (First ed.). Miramax. ISBN 978-0786867172. OCLC 700303086. OL 8143073M – via Internet Archive. A New York Times #1 best seller published in 17 languages

== See also ==
- Hashemites

Royal titles
Vacant Title last held by Alia Al-Hussein	Queen consort of Jordan; June 15, 1978 – February 7, 1999	Succeeded by Rania Al-Abdullah
Academic offices
Preceded by The Prince of Wales	President of the United World Colleges; 1995–present	Incumbent
