= Prince Hashim bin Hussein =

Jordanian prince

Prince Hashim bin Al Hussein
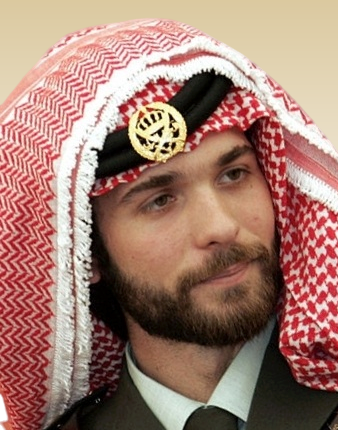
- Born: 10 June 1981 (age 45); Amman, Jordan
- Spouse: Fahdah Mohammed Abunayyan (m. 2006)
- Issue: Princess Haalah; Princess Rayet Al-Noor; Princess Fatima Al-Alia; Prince Hussein Haidara; Prince Mohammad Al-Hassan
Names
- Hashim bin Hussein bin Talal bin Abdullah
- House: Hashemite
- Father: Hussein of Jordan
- Mother: Lisa Halaby

Prince Hashim bin Al Hussein (born 10 June 1981) is the younger of the two sons of King Hussein and Queen Noor of Jordan. In her autobiography, Queen Noor states that Hashim was named after the clan of Hashim (Banu Hashim), the clan to which the Islamic prophet Muhammad and King Hussein belong. He is in the line of succession to the Jordanian throne.

On 29 October 2026, he was appointed as adviser to the king of Jordan, Abdullah II.

== Early life and education ==
Prince Hashim (or Hashem) was born on 10 June 1981 at King Hussein Medical Center in Wadi Al-Seer, Amman. He received his elementary education in Amman at the Amman Baccalaureate School and then attended the schools of Fay School and St. Mark's in the United States. He later graduated from Maret School in Washington, D.C., in 1999. Prince Hashim went to the Royal Military Academy Sandhurst in 2000. He was awarded the Prince Saud Bin Abdullah Prize, presented to the cadet with the highest aggregate mark. After graduating from the Royal Military Academy Sandhurst, he attended Duke University, later transferring to Georgetown University. In August 2005, the Prince obtained an undergraduate degree in Comparative Studies from Georgetown University's Edmund A. Walsh School of Foreign Service. He later graduated in Quran studies at Balqa Applied University in Jordan on 5 September 2006. While serving as a captain in the Jordanian Armed Forces 3rd Royal Ranger Battalion, the prince attended several military and security courses.

== Marriage and family ==
On 6 January 2006, Prince Hashim was engaged to Fahdah Mohammed Abunayyan from Saudi Arabia, and they married on 15 April 2006. The bride's father is Mohammad bin Ibrahim Abunayyan and her maternal grandfather is Sheikh Turki bin Khaled bin Ahmed Al Sudairi, head of the Saudi Human Rights Commission.

They have three daughters and two sons:

- Princess Haalah bint Hashim, born on 6 April 2007 in Amman, Jordan.
- Princess Rayet Al-Noor bint Hashim, born on 4 July 2008.
- Princess Fatima Al-Alia bint Hashim, on 5 November 2011.
- Prince Hussein Haidara bin Hashim, on 15 June 2015.
- Prince Mohammad Al-Hassan bin Hashim, on 21 October 2019.

== Honours ==
- Jordan
  - Knight Grand Cordon of the Supreme Order of the Renaissance, Special Class
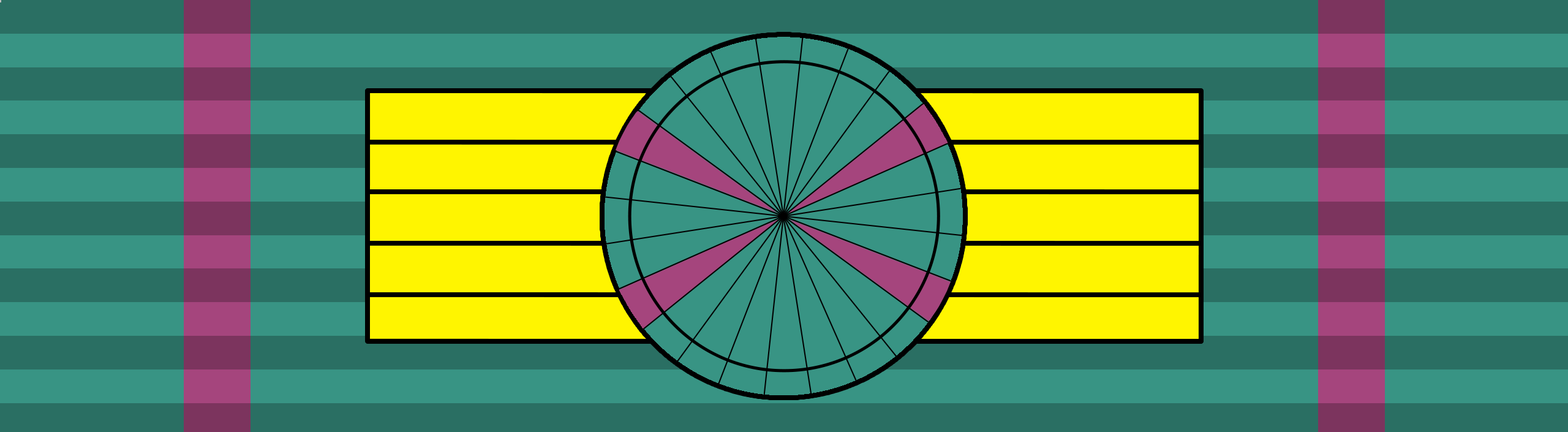
  - Knight Grand Cordon of the Order of the Star of Jordan
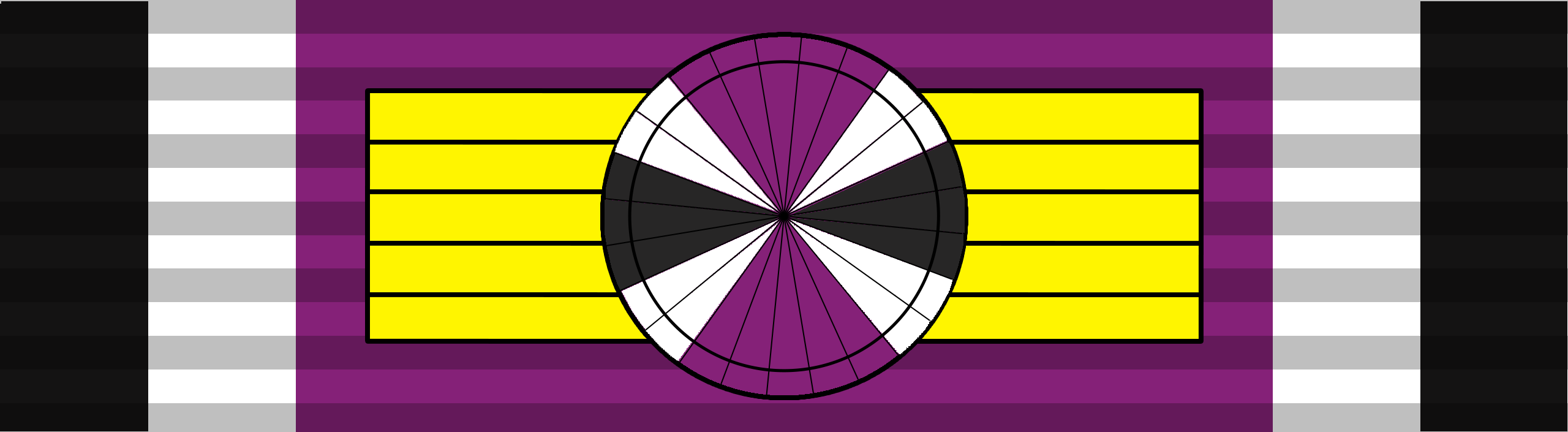
  - Knight Grand Cordon of the Order of Independence
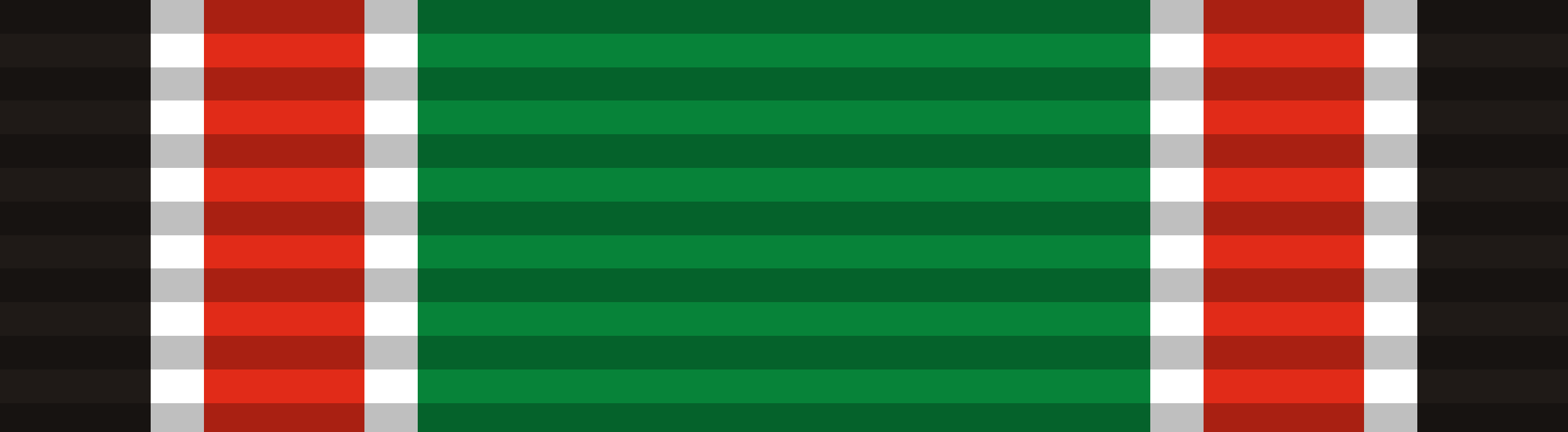
  - Knight of the Order of Military Merit
  - Recipient of the Al-Hussein Medal of Excellence, 1st Class
  - Recipient of the Administrative & Leadership Competence Medal
  - Recipient of the Administrative & Technical Competence Medal
  - Recipient of the Administrative & Training Competence Medal

Royal titles
Preceded by Prince Hussein bin Hamzah	Line of succession to the Jordanian throne 11th position	Succeeded by Prince Hussein bin Hashim
