= 1957 alleged Jordanian military coup attempt =

Alleged coup attempt

Coordinates: 32°05′N 36°06′E

- Part of the Arab Cold War
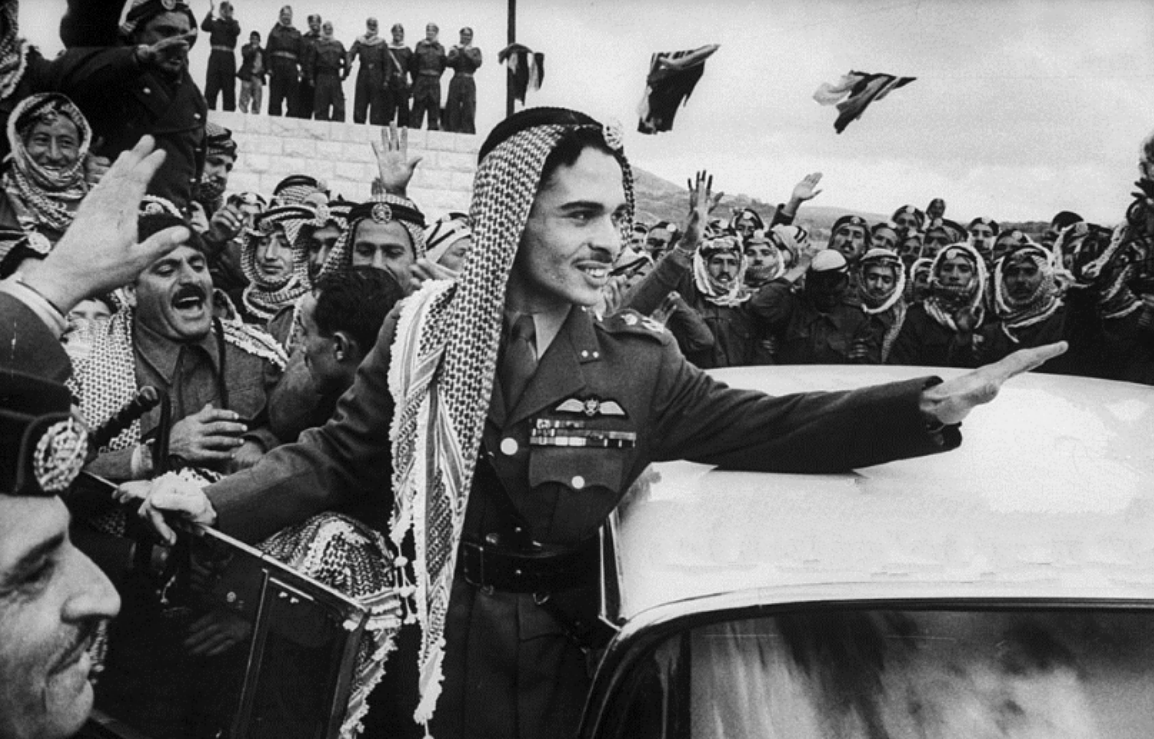
- King Hussein among his troops on 1 March, a month before the alleged coup
Date	13 April 1957
Location	Zarqa, Jordan
Result	Alleged coup attempt failed; Disembodiment of Palestinian-dominated army units; Imposition of martial law

Belligerents
(Jordan) Jordanian Government	(Jordan) Jordanian Free Officers

Commanders and leaders
(Jordan) King Hussein (Jordan) Habis Majali (Jordan) Radi Annab (Jordan) Ali Hayari (Jordan) Zaid ibn Shaker (Jordan) Sharif Nasser	(Jordan) Ali Abu Nuwar (POW) (Jordan) Qassem Al-Nasser (POW) (Jordan) Shaher Abu Shahout (POW)

The 1957 alleged Jordanian military coup attempt refers to violent confrontations on 13 April 1957 at the large army barracks in Zarqa between royalist, mostly Bedouin units, loyal to King Hussein, and Nasserist-style Arab nationalist units.

A military maneuver named "Operation Hashem" was initiated on 8 April and it encircled the capital Amman. When Hussein asked Ali Abu Nuwar, the Army chief of staff, about the maneuver, he claimed that it was a normal military exercise. Hussein, suspicious that this was a show of strength by Abu Nuwar to overthrow him and enter a union with Nasserist Egypt, ordered Abu Nuwar to withdraw the unit, which he did. The Arabist government of Suleiman Nabulsi was forced to resign on 10 April after its policies clashed frequently with that of the Palace. On 13 April, rioting broke in the Zarqa barracks, Hussein (aged 21) went to end the violence between royalist and Arabist units after the Arabists spread rumors that Hussein had been killed. A 3,000-man Syrian force started moving south in support of what they perceived as a coup attempt, but turned around after the army units showed their loyalty to the King.

Two principal accounts emerged regarding the events at Zarqa, with the royalist version holding that the incident was an abortive coup by Abu Nuwar, and the dissident version asserting that it was a staged, American-backed counter-coup by Hussein against the pan-Arabist movement in Jordan. In any case, Abu Nuwar and other senior Arabist officers resigned and were allowed to leave Jordan for Syria, where they incited opposition to the monarchy.

Hussein imposed martial law and disbanded Palestinian-dominated military units after the incident. Although he eventually relaxed some of these measures, namely military curfews and severe press censorship, Hussein's moves significantly curtailed the constitutional democracy that had existed in Jordan in the mid-1950s. The alleged conspirators were sentenced to 15 years in absentia, but were pardoned by Hussein in 1964 as part of his reconciliation efforts with his exiled opposition, and were given senior posts in the government.

== Prelude ==
In the October 1956 general elections, the National Socialist Party (NSP) won 12 seats. King Hussein asked Suleiman Nabulsi, the leader of the NSP to form a government. Thus, he became prime minister of a socialist Arab nationalist government that identified more with Egyptian president Gamal Abdel Nasser than Hussein. Nabulsi merged the Arab Legion with the Palestinian-dominated National Guard, creating a 35,000-strong Jordanian Army, and established diplomatic relations with the Soviet Union. Strained relations between the Palace and the Government reached its peak in March after Nabulsi provided Hussein with a list of senior officers in the military he wanted to dismiss, Hussein heeded initially, but then Nabulsi presented a new list which Hussein refused.

== Events at Zarqa ==
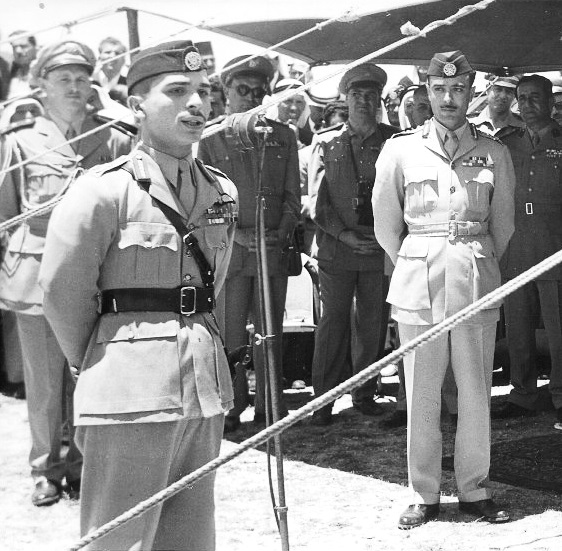
King Hussein addressing his troops as Abu Nuwar observes, sometime in 1956.

Amid the political chaos in Jordan and two days before Nabulsi's forced resignation, an army unit from the First Armoured Brigade commanded by Captain Nadhir Rashid engaged in a maneuver, named "Operation Hashem" in honor of the Hashemite royal family, at the major intersections of Amman. The move raised Hussein's suspicions and prompted him to order Abu Nuwar to withdraw the unit, which he did. Hussein believed the move was a presage to an impending coup. Abu Nuwar sought to allay Hussein's concerns and told him it was a routine exercise executed numerous times in the preceding years to monitor the traffic into and out of the city, while Rashid later claimed it was part of a broader contingency plan to move troops to the West Bank in the event of an Israeli invasion. According to Pearson, Rashid's maneuver was meant to intimidate Hussein, while historian Betty Anderson has speculated that the "officers could have been testing the waters to see what they could achieve militarily". Whatever the actual reason for the maneuver, it heightened Hussein's suspicions of a coup by Abu Nuwar and the Arab nationalists, and it prompted warnings from veteran royalist officials, namely Bahjat al-Talhouni and Sharif Nasser, that such a coup was impending.

On 13 April, rioting broke out at the army barracks in Zarqa, which contained the largest concentration of troops in the country, between mostly hadari (non-Bedouin) units loyal to Abu Nuwar and Bedouin-dominated units loyal to Hussein. Two main accounts emerged regarding this incident, known as the "Zarqa uprising" among other names, with one account having been advanced by Hussein and Western historiographers and the other by political dissidents and many in the Jordanian and Arab press. Pearson has said the "incident is steeped in mystery and persistent controversy", and Anderson likewise has written that "questions abound about whether this coup attempt originated with the military, led by Abu Nuwar and the Free Officers, or with the king and the Americans, who wanted an excuse to remove" the Arab nationalist movement "from Jordan's political scene".

According to Hussein's account of the events, Abu Nuwar and the Free Officers had planned for the Bedouin-dominated First Infantry Regiment in Zarqa to participate in a training exercise in the desert without ammunition to render it unavailable for Hussein to use against a planned anti-government demonstration scheduled to be held by Nabulsi on 14 April. Hussein was still wary of Nabulsi due to an alleged intercept of a message from Nasser imploring Nabulsi to resist his dismissal from the premiership. Hussein was informed of the Free Officers' alleged plot by Sharif Naser and Bedouin officers from Zarqa on the evening of 13 April. The incident coincided with a delivery by Abu Nuwar of an ultimatum to Prime Minister Said al-Mufti (Nabulsi's successor) warning Hussein to appoint a government reflecting the will of the elected parliament or face an army revolt. Al-Mufti apparently broke down emotionally in Hussein's presence, prompting the latter to inquire from Abu Nuwar about the ultimatum, to which Abu Nuwar professed his surprise. Hussein then brought Abu Nuwar along with him to inspect the scene at Zarqa, where Hussein was told by loyalist officers from Zarqa that rumors of his death had provoked heavy clashes between his loyalists and those of Abu Nuwar and that only the physical presence of Hussein would put an end to the fighting. Moreover, Hussein was told that Rashid and Ma'an Abu Nuwar (a distant cousin of Abu Nuwar) had been ordered to Amman to besiege the royal palace and arrest Hussein. A 3,000 men Syrian force started moving south in support of what they perceived as a coup attempt, but turned around after the army units showed their loyalty to the King.

Both accounts agree that the during the fighting in al-Zarqa, numerous Free Officers were rounded up and arrested by loyalist Bedouin officers. Both accounts also agree that as Hussein made his way into Zarqa, he was cheered on by loyalist soldiers and he intervened in the middle of the clashes at his own risk and was emotionally embraced by his supporters, who chanted "Death to Abu Nuwar and all the traitors!" Abu Nuwar remained in the car, fearful for his life by Hussein's loyalist troops and he then apparently begged Hussein to protect him and allow him to return to Amman, which Hussein agreed to. By nightfall, Abu Nuwar persuaded Hussein to allow him to leave the country and on the morning of 14 March, he officially resigned and departed for Damascus, Syria, with his family.

Major-General Ali al-Hiyari, Abu Nuwar's chief rival in the Jordanian army, was appointed as Abu Nuwar's replacement, but on 20 April, he defected to Syria. Al-Hiyari claimed that prior to the incident at Zarqa and shortly after the forced resignation of al-Nabulsi's cabinet, palace officials had canvassed the army general staff to inquire about the officers' opinions regarding a change in direction of the new government away from the pan-Arabist policies of Egypt and Syria. Accordingly, when Abu Nuwar and the Free Officers voiced their refusal "to use the army against" the popular will in the country, palace officials laid out plans to royalist officers, including al-Hiyari, for a false flag operation at Zarqa. Al-Hiyari's account was widely reported throughout Jordan and the Arab world, and despite dismissal of the account by palace officials, it led to further public skepticism toward the official version of events regarding the alleged coup plot.

Abu Nuwar consistently denied any betrayal of Hussein and claimed he was a "fall man", the victim of political intrigue in the kingdom in which his rivals sought to discredit him. At a press conference in Damascus, he stated that the entire incident was an overreaction by Hussein to sensational and false reports of a coup plot and that the incident was likely a preemptive coup by Hussein and the old guard, supported or engineered by US intelligence, against the main proponents of pan-Arab unity in Jordan. Rashid and Ma'an Abu Nuwar likewise strongly denied any kind of coup plot on their end. According to Pearson, the accounts of the Free Officers and al-Hiyari were lent further credence by the lack of evidence in the military trials against the alleged conspirators who were arrested, the light sentences that they were given and the eventual rehabilitation of the alleged conspirators, including Abu Nuwar, who were later reassigned to high-ranking posts in the state and military.

== Aftermath ==
On 22 April, Abu Nuwar issued a radio statement from the Cairo-based Voice of the Arabs radio station denouncing Hussein. In coordination with Abu Nuwar, the following day, a Patriotic Congress consisting of Hussein's opposition was held in Nablus in the West Bank demanding major palace officials be dismissed, expulsion of the American ambassador and military attaché, rejection of the Eisenhower Doctrine, federal unity with Egypt and Syria and reinstatement of the dismissed army officers, including Abu Nuwar. As a result of the congress, Hussein put Nablus, East Jerusalem and Amman under military curfew, dissolved political parties, imposed press censorship, dismissed municipal councils in the West Bank in favor of military governors, disbanded Palestinian-dominated army units, arrested al-Nabulsi (who had since been made foreign minister) and dismissed the cabinet of Prime Minister Fakhri al-Khalidi. Although he eventually relaxed some of these measures, namely military curfews and severe press censorship, Hussein's moves significantly curtailed the constitutional democracy that had existed in Jordan in the mid-1950s. The incident strained Jordan's relations with Syria and Egypt.

Egypt and Syria announced a union under the United Arab Republic, headed by Gamal Abdel Nasser in February 1958. The announcement led to Jordan and Hashemite Iraq to found the Arab Federation just a few weeks afterwards. On 14 July, King Faisal II of Iraq (Hussein's cousin) was killed in a bloody coup along with the rest of the Hashemite family in Iraq. The coup transformed Iraq into a republic, thus ending the federation between the two countries. Former prime minister Ibrahim Hashem and other Jordanian officials who were on an official visit to Iraq were also killed.

== See also ==
- Arab Federation
- Black September
- 14 July Revolution
- 1958 Jordan crisis

== Bibliography ==
- Hiro, Dilip (2003), The Essential Middle East: A Comprehensive Guide, Carroll & Graf Publishers, ISBN 0-7867-1269-4
- Anderson, Betty Signe (2005). Nationalist Voices in Jordan: The Street and the State. University of Texas Press. ISBN 978-0-292-70625-5.
- Dann, Uriel (1989). King Hussein and the Challenge of Arab Radicalism. Oxford University Press. ISBN 978-0-19-536121-6.
- Haddadin, Munther (6 December 2012). Diplomacy on the Jordan: International Conflict and Negotiated Resolution. Springer Science & Business Media. ISBN 9781461515135.
- Massad, Joseph Andoni (2001). Colonial Effects: The Making of National Identity in Jordan. Columbia University Press. ISBN 978-0-231-12322-8.
- Pearson, Ivan L. G. (2010). In the Name of Oil: Anglo-American Relations in the Middle East, 1950–1958. Sussex Academic Press. ISBN 978-1-84519-388-1.
- Shlaim, Avi (2007). Lion of Jordan: The Life of King Hussein in War and Peace. Vintage Books. ISBN 978-1-4000-7828-8.
- Yitzhak, Ronen (2012). Abdullah Al-Tall, Arab Legion Officer: Arab Nationalism and Opposition to the Hashemite Regime. Sussex Academic Press. ISBN 978-1-84519-408-6.
