= National Socialist Party (Jordan) =

National Socialist Party الحزب الوطني الاشتراكي
- Abbreviation: NSP
- Leader: Suleiman Nabulsi
- Founded: 1954
- Dissolved: 1957
- Headquarters: Amman, Jordan
- Ideology: Socialism; Arab nationalism Nasserism; Factions: Republicanism
- Political position: Left-wing
- National affiliation: National Front

The National Socialist Party (Arabic: الحزب الوطني الاشتراكي, romanized: Al-Hizb Al-Watani Al-Ishtiraki) was a left-wing socialist political party established in Jordan in 1954.

The party contested the 1956 election on 21 October, becoming the largest party in the 40-member House of Representatives after they won 12 seats. Consequently, King Hussein asked Suleiman Nabulsi, the leader of the party, to form a government. Nabulsi's cabinet included independent ministers and Communists, lasting for less than a couple of months after its policies frequently clashed with that of the Palace. Three days after royalist officials forced Nabulsi's resignation on 10 April 1957, there was an alleged coup attempt by Ali Abu Nuwar (then Army Chief of Staff), said to have sympathized with Nabulsi and the Arab nationalist movement.

The Party led the only democratically elected government in Jordan's history. As a response to the coup attempt, Hussein declared martial law and banned political parties until 1989.

== Background ==
Suleiman Nabulsi (born 1908) was a Jordanian political activist. He was appointed as Jordan's ambassador to Britain in 1953. His experience in Britain turned him into a staunch Arab nationalist and anti-Zionist, and he resigned 5 months later from the post. Returning to Jordan in 1954, his nationalism alienated him from King Hussein who had him exiled from the capital Amman to a provincial town. At this time, his supporters established the National Socialist Party (NSP) and Nabulsi was elected its leader. The Party aimed at reducing the grip of the Palace on politics, and establishing greater relations with anti-imperialist Arab states at the expense of Britain. The 1950s witnessed the rise of Nasserism, a socialist Arab nationalist political ideology based on the thinking of Egyptian President Gamal Abdel Nasser. Jordan captured the West Bank during the 1948 Arab–Israeli War, and it annexed the territory in 1950. Jordan's population now was two-thirds Palestinian who outnumbered Transjordanians, the Palestinians had identified with Nasser more than Hussein. Nasser's Egyptian–Czechoslovak arms deal in September 1955 and the July 1956 nationalization of the Suez Canal had greatly added to his popularity across the Arab World.

== History ==
The 40-member lower house of parliament, the House of Representatives, was divided equally between the two banks (20 seats each). However, the West Bank had 175,000 eligible voters, and the East Bank (Transjordan) 129,000.

Winning 12 out of 40 seats in the 1956 elections, King Hussein asked Nabulsi, the leader of the largest party in parliament, to form a government. Nabulsi's 11-member cabinet, included 7 ministers from the NSP, one from the Arab Socialist Ba'ath Party, one Communist, and two independents.

One of Nabulsi's first measures as prime minister: he merged the Arab Legion with the Palestinian-dominated National Guard, creating a 35,000-strong Jordanian Army. Two days after his ascension to government, Egypt under Gamal Abdel Nasser was invaded by a tripartite alliance consisting of Britain, France, and Israel.

Nabulsi also decided to establish diplomatic relations with the Soviet Union and allowed the CFJ to publish a weekly newspaper. However, on 2 February 1957, the king warned against this in a speech directed to Nabulsi, saying "We want this country to be inaccessible to Communist propaganda and Bolshevik theories." Heeding to Hussein's request, Nabulsi ordered the CFJ's paper to be banned. Nabulsi was known to be an admirer of Nasser, and so called for Jordan to join an Arab federation with Egypt and Syria thereby reducing King Hussein to a figurehead.

Relations between the cabinet and the king were further strained when Hussein dispatched personal envoys to Cairo, Damascus, and Jeddah in March 1957 with messages not vetted by the government. In response, Nabulsi presented the king with formal requests to retire senior public servants, threatening his cabinet would resign and take to the streets if the requests were refused. Hussein initially appealed, but after Nabulsi prepared a new list, Hussein sent him a letter warning him that he would be dismissed. On 8 April, an army brigade commanded by Nader Rashid, an Arab nationalist officer, departed from its garrison in Zarqa—under orders from the nationalist chief of staff, Ali Abu Nuwar, and without authorization from Hussein — and positioned itself to control the access road to the capital Amman. Upon hearing of the brigade's movements, Hussein ordered they retreat back to their base, to which they complied. Hussein viewed Nuwar and Rashid's actions as part of a conspiracy to topple him and enter a union with the United Arab Republic. Two days later, Nabulsi was pressured to hand in his resignation by senior royalist officials, which he did. That was followed by an alleged coup attempt on 10 April by Abu Nuwar.

On 22 April, Nabulsi attended the Patriotic Congress in Nablus, which brought together opponents of the monarchy. The conference called for a federation with the United Arab Republic, the establishment of a 16-member presidential council, a purge of "traitors and conspiratorial (sic elements)" and a general strike to pressure Hussein. Upon pressure from the army, under complete control of the royalists after Abu Nuwar's exile by Hussein a few days prior, Nabulsi handed in his resignation for a second time on 23 April. Mass protests in the West Bank and Amman ensued the next day demanding his return. Hussein declared martial law on 25 April; all political parties and Nabulsi was put under house arrest without being charged. He was pardoned by Hussein and released on 13 August 1961.

== Election results ==
Election	Leader	Seats	Government	References
1956	Suleiman Nabulsi	12 / 40	Government	

== See also ==
- Nasserism
- Suleiman Nabulsi's cabinet

== Bibliography ==
- Anderson, Betty Signe (2005), Nationalist Voices in Jordan: The Street and the State, University of Texas Press, ISBN 978-0-292-70625-5
- Dann, Uriel (1989), King Hussein and the Challenge of Arab Radicalism, Oxford University Press, ISBN 9780195361216
- Hiro, Dilip (2003), The Essential Middle East: A Comprehensive Guide, Carroll & Graf Publishers, ISBN 0-7867-1269-4
- Lesch, David W. (2003), The Middle East and the United States: a historical and political reassessment, Westview Press, ISBN 0-8133-3940-5
- Rabinovich, Itamar (1978), From June to October: the Middle East between 1967 and 1973, Transaction Publishers, ISBN 0-87855-230-8
