= 1958 Jordan crisis =

1958 attempted overthrow of the Jordanian government

- Part of the Arab Cold War and the Cold War
Date	14th of July, 1958 - 1st of October, 1958
Location	Amman, Jordan
Result	Jordanian government victory; Weakening of anti-Hashemite and Nasserist actors in Jordan; Strengthening of Hussein's rule; End of martial law

Belligerents
Jordanian Government Supported by: United Kingdom United States	Jordanian Free Officers Supported by: United Arab Republic

Commanders and leaders
Hussein of Jordan; Samir Al-Rifai; Habis Majali; Sharif Nasser; (United Kingdom) Harold Macmillan; (United States) Dwight D. Eisenhower	Mahmud Rusan; Muhammad Rusan; (United Arab Republic) Gamal Abdel Nasser; (United Arab Republic) Abdel Hamid al-Sarraj

The 1958 Jordan crisis (Arabic: أزمة الأردن في 1958) was an attempted coup against the regime of King Hussein during the summer of 1958 and immediately following the overthrow of the monarchy in Iraq on 14 July 1958. It was allegedly organized by opposition forces supported by Syria and Egypt then forming a single entity known as the United Arab Republic (UAR). It took place in the context of the Eisenhower Doctrine, by which the US had pledged to protect militarily the regimes in the Middle East sympathetic to it against any subversive and/or Communist activities. The doctrine had been activated in Lebanon by President Camille Chamoune as part of the 1958 Lebanese civil war and led to the landing of US Marines in Beirut. Similarly, Jordan had a British military landing around the same period (17 July 1958) to protect the Jordanian regime from being overthrown.

The coup date was allegedly set for the 17th of July. The coup attempt followed another alleged coup attempt in 1957 also orchestrated by the UAR.

== Background ==
In 1957, an alleged coup d'état was attempted against the Hashemite monarchy, again funded by both Egypt and Syria. In the aftermath, the democratically elected government was deposed, and the state was placed under martial law. With the abrogation of the 1948 Anglo-Jordanian treaty and the Arabisation of the army, Amman's reliance on the UK decreased, yet relations were unaffected. Under the Eisenhower doctrine, the US became the primary backer of the Hashemite monarchy, while the UK still retained influence. Under the same doctrine, a 'division of labour' was agreed upon by the US and the UK, whereby the US would back the government of Lebanon, and the UK would back the government of Jordan, and by extension the Hashemites.

Tensions continued to simmer in late 1957, as Hussein's opponents kept operating supported by Egypt and the Syrian Deuxieme bureau. For instance, on the 12th of December, 1957, Hussein visited Nablus, one of the hotspots for Anti-Hashemite activity, where his welcome was 'not entirely spontaneous'. Mere days later, a member of the Tuqan family gave a speech supporting the Hashemites in the city, where he was attacked with acid on the streets in the aftermath. Members of the 'Tahrir' (liberation) party were arrested in December, and multiple bomb attacks (one targeting the governor of Amman, Saad Jumaa, and another targeting US oil prospect missions in Jordan) occurred the same month. This led Hussein to attempt to intimidate his opposition by passing harsh laws, such as 15 years imprisonment for the possession or selling/purchasing of automatic weapons and explosives, and the death penalty for using such items with the 'intent to kill or cause damage'. However, the opposition remained undeterred, as further arrests continued in January.

In late January, plans for a union between Egypt and Syria were underway, which Hussein viewed as a direct threat. These fears would be the catalyst for the Hashemite Arab Federation's formation between Jordan and Iraq. On the 1st of February, Hashemite fears would be realised, as the UAR was formed, leading to the formation of the Arab Federation (AF). A propaganda battle ensued between the two unions.

For example, Nasser criticised the 'collaborators of imperialism' in Amman and Baghdad as trying to 'appease their imperialist masters'. Jordan would respond (via Radio Amman) criticising the UAR for allowing the UNEF to occupy Sinai. Both states actively blocked the other's radio broadcasts in an attempt to censor the other's propaganda. The AF was deeply unpopular, and many Jordanians would have preferred being a part of Nasser's union.

Two plots would be formed against the Hashemites. The smaller one planned for February involved the subversion of the national guard by the 'free officers', while the much more important operation (the Crisis of 1958) was planned for July. This information was granted to the Hashemite authorities by the CIA stationed in Amman.

Using the information, a cadet would be arrested and interrogated upon which he would reveal that he had been hired to assassinate King Hussein and his uncle Sharif Nasser in a plot coordinated with a similar assassination of King Faisal of Iraq. Subsequently, Iraqi authorities would be notified of the plot and pledged to take action.

== Events ==
The overthrow of Iraq would ironically occur as a direct result of Hussein's fears. He requested military support from Iraq, and the Iraqi PM Nuri Al-Said would send the 20th Brigade over. However, en route to Jordan, the brigade would turn around and overthrow the Iraqi monarchy. Hussein would make many attempts to halt the coup d'état, and attempted to assert control of the Iraqi army (under which he was permitted to according to the Arab Federation agreement), to no avail. The Iraqi brigade in Al-Mafraq retreated to Iraq upon hearing of the coup d'état to join them, and the Iraqi army almost entirely defected to the revolutionaries.

Hussein took multiple measures to prevent the coup d'état expanding into Jordan. He assumed direct control of the Arab Federation, and ordered the army to suppress hostile demonstrations ruthlessly, and to guard foreign consulates and embassies across the state. Nablus had minor strikes, but these were easily suppressed after a blockade of the city.

After news of the planned coup d'état reached London, British contingency plans were activated, however, a fear remained that the situation would be a repeat of the Suez Crisis, whereby foreign powers force them to leave. Fears that Israel would seize the West Bank and East Jerusalem were widespread in both the British and Jordanian governments. Britain would ask Israel for permission to use Israeli airspace for 'Operation Fortitude', their plan in Jordan.

On the 16th of July, a day before the planned coup, King Hussein summoned the British chargé d'affaires (Heath Mason) and his American counterpart (Thomas Wright) to discuss an 'emergency', where they were informed of the planned coup's date. Hussein and his PM Samir Al-Rifa'i was informed of 'Operation Fortitude' in the same meeting.

=== Operation Fortitude ===
In this operation (completely separate from the WW2 operation, although they share the same name), British forces would NOT directly intervene. Although Al-Rifa'i campaigned for the British to intervene directly in Iraq, citing the Baghdad Pact, this was outright refused. The plan's aims were for British forces to overfly Israel and land in Amman, where they would be sent to protect the Raghadan Palace and an airbase in Amman. Requests were made for British forces to man the border with Israel and Syria, and these were rejected outright.

The operation would begin on the morning of the 17th of July, as British planes entered Israeli airspace before being cleared for use. This would lead to Israeli Anti-air batteries firing on British planes, forcing some to withdraw back to Cyprus. After the US agreed to protect Israel from any retaliatory attacks, did they agree to the operation. British forces landed practically unopposed, as the efforts of the Jordanian Security Forces and fears of Israeli intervention kept opponents of the Hashemites quiet, and the coup was aborted.

== Aftermath ==
Hussein, after the coup attempt, would move to re-establish 'personal contact' with his army, in a programme of visits to barracks and military bases across the state. He also campaigned to raise new Bedouin legions of the army, as they were seen as more loyal to the Hashemites, which they were. A defensive pact between Greece, Turkey, Italy, West Germany, Lebanon, Sudan, and Jordan was proposed by Al-Rifa'i, but this never came to fruition.

On the 31st of July, Hussein was informed that the USA and Britain planned to recognise the new Iraqi government, whereby Hussein agreed to dismantle the fiction of the Arab Union. British forces were present with an uneasy calm in Jordan, as two bombings occurred organised by collaborators of the Syrian Deuxieme Bureau, leading to Hussein planning to execute the collaborators before Britain recommended he didn't, to build up British public support for his government.

As a result of the escalating violence on the capital, with two bombings on the 29th of July and the 3rd of August, fears of a takeover would rise once more. British plans for an all-out uprising would be to secure the King and his close family, and evacuate them from Jordan, and secure the airbase until all British forces were evacuated. British forces, although not meant to use force to restore Hussein to power in the event of a successful coup, were authorised to use aggressive force if attacked, to be supported by the RAF overflying Israel (if permission was granted) or Syria (if Israel declined - even though this violates the UAR's sovereignty).

Israeli intentions were unknown regarding the West Bank. They informed Britain and France that, even were Jordan to collapse into civil war, they would not invade the West Bank. However, they informed the Americans that they would have no other option were the Jordanian government to collapse.

On the 1st of October, British forces were announced to be leaving Jordan, replaced by a UN mission. This aided Hashemite propaganda, as they claimed that the threat was an external one, and thus a direct threat to Jordanian independence. The British evacuation would begin on the 20th of October, and end by the 2nd of November. British forces were given permission to overfly Syria, and jets ordered by Jordan were allowed to overfly Syria in a statement to cement the end of the crisis, and peaceful relations between the UAR and Jordan. On the 1st of December, 1958, martial law would be abolished (which had been in effect since April 1957), definitively marking the end of the crisis.

After the conflict, Hussein would move to solidify Western relations, as the primary benefactor of Jordan definitively shifted from the UK pre-crisis to the US afterwards. The crisis proved the point that the UK was unable to act independently, as both the UK and Israel waited for US permission before acting, cementing the same conclusion as a result of the Suez Crisis.

== See also ==
- 1958 Lebanon Crisis
- 14 July Revolution
- Suez Crisis
- 1957 alleged Jordanian military coup attempt
