= Suleiman Nabulsi =

Prime minister of Jordan

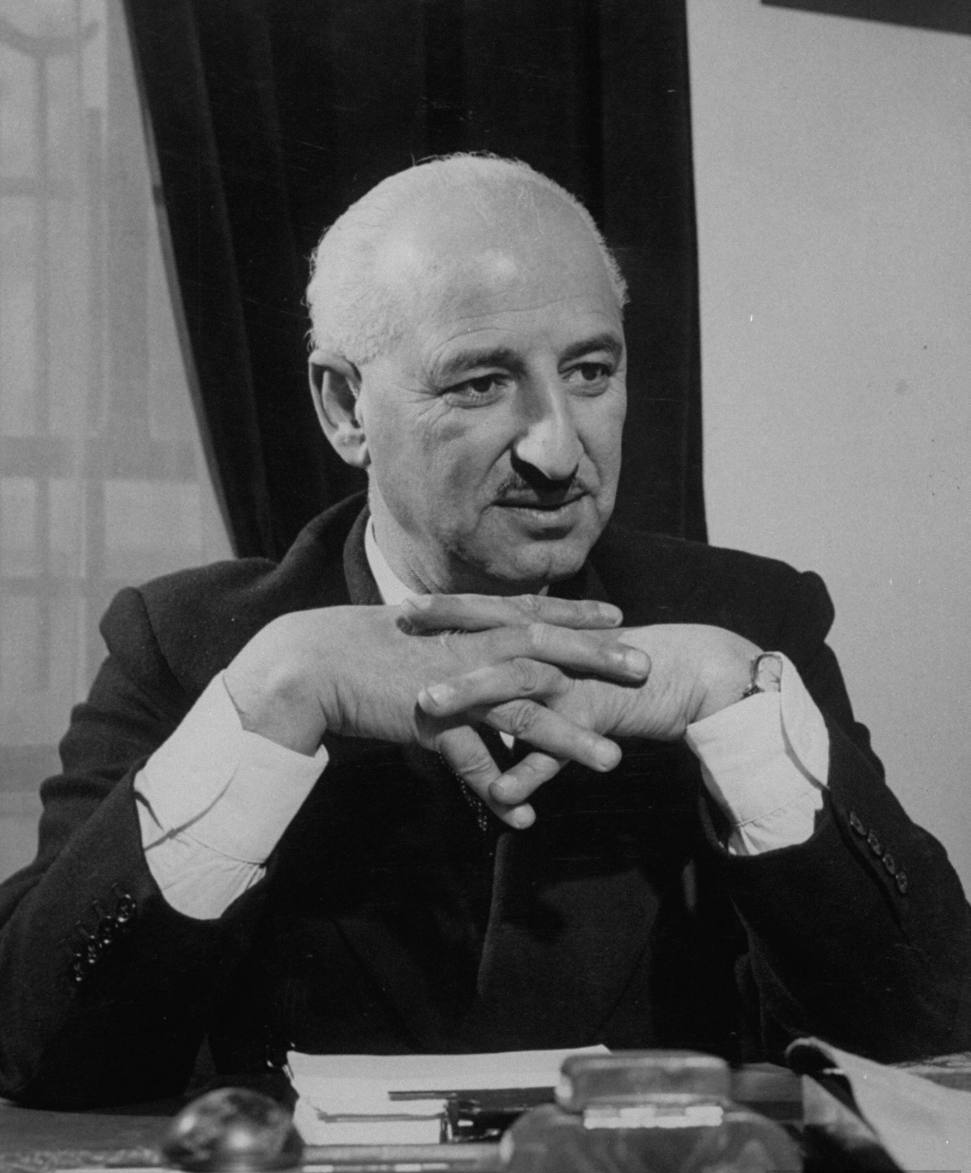
- Suleiman Nabulsi in his study

12th Prime Minister of Jordan
- In office 29 October 1956 – 13 April 1957
- Monarch: Hussein
- Preceded by: Ibrahim Hashem
- Succeeded by: Fakhri al-Khalidi

Minister of Finance
- In office 1947–1947
- Monarch: Hussein
- Preceded by: Nokola Ghanima
- Succeeded by: Mohammad al-Shoreki
- In office 1950–1951
- Monarch: Abdullah I
- Preceded by: Suleiman Al-Sukar
- Succeeded by: Abdulrahman Khalifa

Minister of Foreign Affairs
- In office 15 April 1957 – 25 April 1957
- Monarch: Hussein
- Preceded by: Abdullah Rimawi

Ambassador of Jordan to the United Kingdom
- In office 1953–1954

Personal details
- Born: 1908 Salt, Vilayet of Damascus, Ottoman Empire
- Died: 14 October 1976 (aged 67–68) Amman, Jordan
- Party: National Socialist Party

Suleiman Nabulsi (Arabic: سليمان النابلسي; 1908 – 14 October 1976) was a leftist Jordanian political figure who served as the 12th Prime Minister of Jordan in 1956–57.

In October 1956 during the 1956 elections, the National Socialist Party headed by Nabulsi won a plurality of 16 out of 40 seats in the Jordanian House of Representatives. Subsequently, King Hussein asked him to form a government; it was the first elected government in Jordan's history.

Nabulsi's government was short-lived. His policies as Prime Minister frequently clashed with that of King Hussein's. Nabulsi wanted Jordan to move closer to Egypt under Gamal Abdel Nasser, but Hussein wanted it to stay in the Western camp. Disagreements between the monarchy and the leftist government culminated after Nabulsi provided Hussein with an expanded list of officers in the army he wanted to dismiss. Nabulsi was forced to resign in April 1957, following an alleged coup attempt against Hussein.

== Early life ==
Nabulsi was born in Salt, Jordan in 1908, during the Ottoman period. The ancestors of the Nabulsi family were Arabs from central Syria who originally served as members of the elite Ottoman sipahi units that were sent on a 1657 expedition to bring Jabal Nablus under centralized Ottoman rule. The family soon became part of the merchant class in Nablus, hence their name Nabulsi ("from Nablus").

Suleiman Nabulsi graduated from the American University of Beirut with a degree in law and social studies in the early 1930s. Afterward, he briefly served as a teacher in Karak where he generated a "feeling of Arab brotherhood," leading the first demonstration in the city condemning the Balfour Declaration. As a result, the British authorities in the country immediately transferred him to a secondary school in his hometown of Salt. He moved to Amman in 1932. He later joined the civil service and eventually became the director of the state-owned Agricultural Bank, a post he held until 1946. In 1945, British authorities accused him of agitating in Jerusalem against a concession to a Jewish company. Upon his return to Jordan, he was arrested at the Allenby Bridge, then forcibly moved to Shoubak in southern Jordan.

== Political career ==
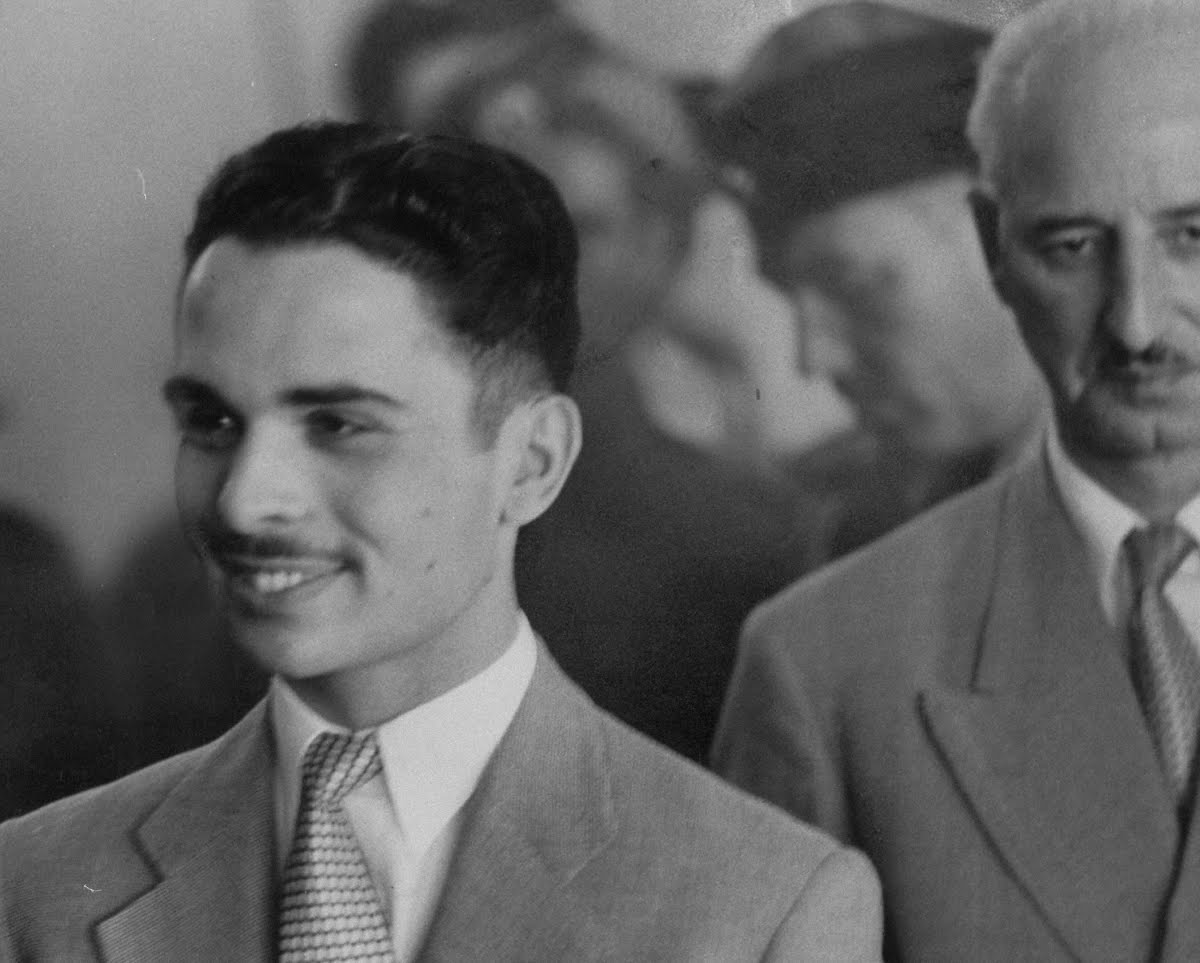
King Hussein with PM Suleiman Nabulsi

In 1947, Nabulsi served as Minister of Finance, then again from 1950 to 1951. He was jailed for nine months in the Amman Prison for writing an article condemning the 1948 Anglo-Jordanian treaty. However, like most politicians of the time, his opposition activities did not hinder his political career. When he entered into the government as finance minister in 1950, King Abdullah bestowed him on the title of "Pasha." In 1953, he was appointed Jordan's ambassador to Britain until 1954 when he returned to Amman from London. His experience there turned him into a staunch Arab nationalist and anti-Zionist. His nationalism had alienated him from King Hussein who had him exiled from the capital Amman to a provincial town. At this time, he founded the National Socialist Party (NSP) and was elected its leader. He soon became known by many of his supporters as Za'im al-Watani ("The Nationalist Leader"). In July 1956, Nabulsi gave a speech commending Egyptian president Gamal Abdel Nasser for nationalizing the Suez Canal and stressing the importance of Nasser's leadership of the Arab world.

Nabulsi entered his party into an electoral alliance with the Jordanian Regional Branch of the Ba'ath Party and Jordanian Communist Party to form the National Front (NF) which called for freeing Jordan of foreign influence, political, economic, and military cooperation with Arab nationalist states, and aiding other Arab states with their fight against imperialism. They failed in their attempt to gain a majority in the 40-member Jordanian parliament, allegedly due to poll rigging by King Hussein's allies. However, they did win twelve seats, making it the largest bloc, and as leader of the NF, Nabulsi managed to prevent Jordan from entering the Central Treaty Organization (Baghdad Pact) alliance in 1955, then succeeded in getting Hussein to dissolve the parliament.

=== Prime Minister of Jordan ===
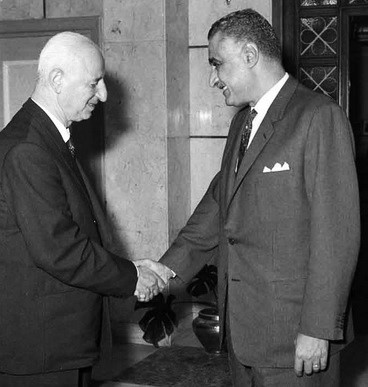
Nabulsi with Egyptian President Gamal Abdel Nasser in Cairo while heading the Jordanian delegation to the Arab Parliament Conference, 1968

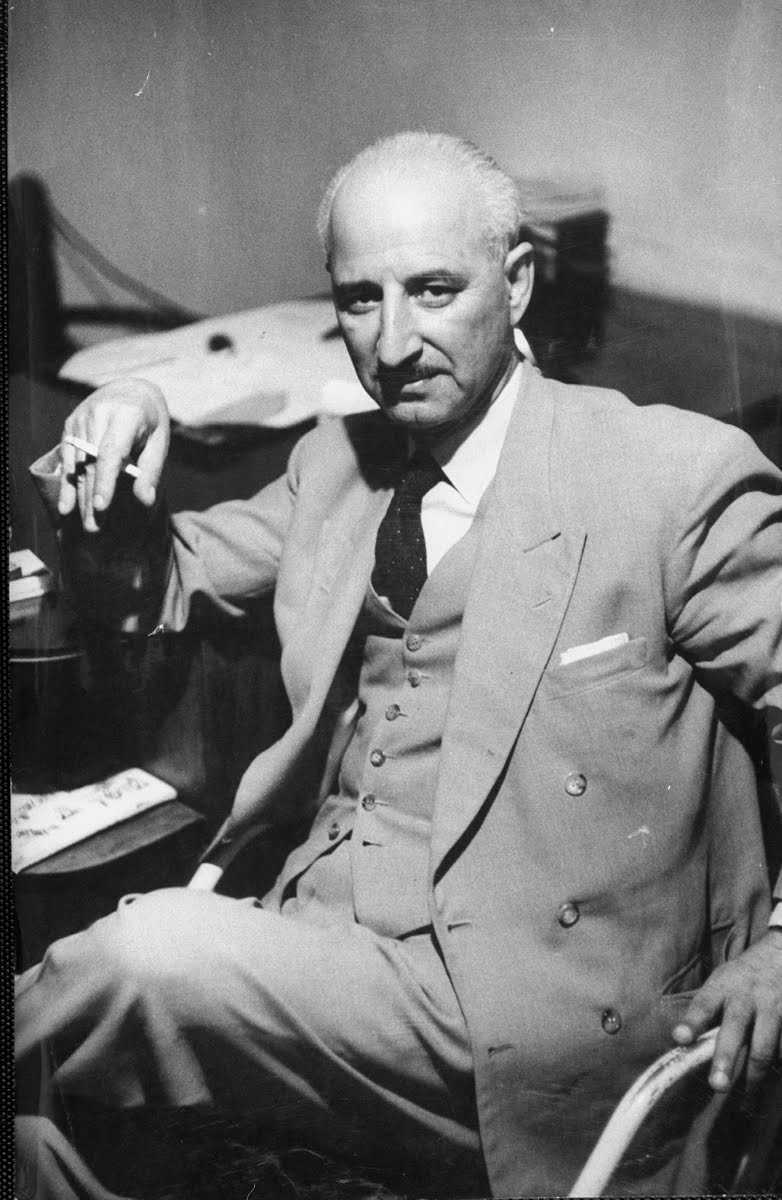
Suleiman Nabulsi smoking, October 1956.

In the October 1956 parliamentary elections, the NF won 16 seats and Nabulsi was asked by Hussein to form a government. Thus, he became prime minister and as one of his first measures, he merged the Arab Legion with the Palestinian-dominated National Guard, creating a 35,000-strong Jordanian Army. Two days after his ascension to government, Egypt was invaded by a tripartite alliance consisting of Britain, France, and Israel. While an enraged King Hussein favored militarily assisting Egypt, Nabulsi called for a delay to wait for the results of the invasion. Eventually, Hussein agreed not to help militarily. The conflict ended with an Egyptian political victory and the ultimate withdrawal of the coalition from the Suez, which Jordan didn't participate in due to Nabulsi's stance.

Nabulsi also decided to establish diplomatic relations with the Soviet Union and allowed the Communist Party to publish a weekly newspaper. However, on 2 February 1957, the king warned against this in a speech directed to Nabulsi, saying "We want this country to be inaccessible to Communist propaganda and Bolshevik theories." Heeding to Hussein's request, Nabulsi ordered the Communist Party organ to be banned. Nabulsi was known to be an admirer of Nasser, and so called for Jordan to join an Arab federation with Egypt and Syria thereby reducing King Hussein to a figurehead.

Relations between the cabinet and the king were further strained when Hussein dispatched personal envoys to Cairo, Damascus, and Jeddah in March 1957 with messages not vetted by the government. In response, Nabulsi presented the king with formal requests to retire senior public servants, threatening his cabinet would resign and take to the streets if the requests were refused. Hussein initially appealed, but after Nabulsi prepared a new list, Hussein sent him a letter warning him that he would be dismissed. On 8 April, an army brigade commanded by Nader Rashid, an Arab nationalist officer, departed from its garrison in Zarqa — under orders from the nationalist chief of staff, Ali Abu Nuwar, and without authorization from Hussein — and positioned itself to control the access road to the capital Amman. Upon hearing of the brigade's movements, Hussein ordered they retreat back to their base, to which they complied. Hussein viewed Nuwar and Rashid's actions as part of a conspiracy to topple him and enter a union with the United Arab Republic. Two days later, Nabulsi was pressured to hand in his resignation by senior royalist officials, which he did.

On April 15, a new cabinet was formed by Fakhri al-Khalidi and Nabulsi was given the post of foreign minister. Tensions between Arab nationalist and royalist officers began to increase as did public unrest, with nationalists and leftists demanding the reinstatement of Nabulsi as Prime Minister and royalists and Islamists backing Hussein. On 22 April, Nabulsi attended the Patriotic Congress in Nablus, which brought together opponents of the monarchy. The conference called for a federation with the United Arab Republic, the establishment of a 16-member presidential council, a purge of "traitors and conspiratorial (sic elements)" and a general strike to pressure Hussein. Upon pressure from the army, under complete control of the royalists after Abu Nuwar's exile by Hussein a few days prior, Nabulsi handed in his resignation for a second time on 23 April. Mass protests in the West Bank and Amman ensued the next day demanding his return. Hussein declared martial law on 25 April; all political parties were banned and Nabulsi was put under house arrest without being charged. He was pardoned by Hussein and released on 13 August 1961.

In 1968, the National Gathering party was formed in Jordan with Nabulsi as its leader. It included the members of banned political parties. On 28 April 1968, Nabulsi headed the Jordanian parliamentary delegation to Arab Parliament Conference in Cairo.

== See also ==
- Politics of Jordan
- Suleiman Nabulsi's cabinet

== Bibliography ==
- Anderson, Betty Signe (2005), Nationalist Voices in Jordan: The Street and the State, University of Texas Press, ISBN 978-0-292-70625-5
- Dann, Uriel (1989), King Hussein and the Challenge of Arab Radicalism, Oxford University Press, ISBN 9780195361216
- Hiro, Dilip (2003), The Essential Middle East: A Comprehensive Guide, Carroll & Graf Publishers, ISBN 0-7867-1269-4
- Lesch, David W. (2003), The Middle East and the United States: a historical and political reassessment, Westview Press, ISBN 0-8133-3940-5
- Rabinovich, Itamar (1978), From June to October: the Middle East between 1967 and 1973, Transaction Publishers, ISBN 0-87855-230-8

Political offices
| Preceded by Ibrahim Hashem | Prime Minister of Jordan; 1956–1957 | Succeeded by Husayin al-Khalidi |
