= Faris Glubb =

British writer, journalist, translator and publisher

Faris Glubb (born Godfrey Peter Manley Glubb; 19 October 1939 – 3 April 2004) was a British writer, journalist, translator, publisher, and political activist notable for his deep engagement with Middle Eastern affairs and Palestinian causes. Born in Jerusalem during the British Mandate of Palestine, the son of the famed “Glubb Pasha” (Sir John Bagot Glubb), he grew up among Bedouin soldiers in Transjordan, acquired fluency in Arabic, and later converted to Islam.

Glubb built a career combining journalism with activism. He reported on major conflicts in the Arab world (including the Lebanese Civil War), translated and published works concerning Zionism, justice for Palestinians, and international law, and was known for his frank commentary and advocacy for human rights.

His unique position as a bridge figure—born into a British military family yet immersed in Arab culture, faith, and politics—gave him both insight and controversy. At his death in 2004 in Kuwait, Glubb was still active intellectually, working toward a doctorate on medieval relations between Richard the Lionheart and Saladin based on Vatican documents.

== Early life ==
He was born in Jerusalem, British Mandate of Palestine as Godfrey Peter Manley Glubb. He was the son of British officer Sir John Bagot Glubb KCB CMG DSO OBE MC, who, as the chief military advisor to the Jordanian military, became known as Glubb Pasha, and his wife, Muriel Rosemary Forbes. Sir John was commander of the Arab Legion. Godfrey grew up in Transjordan among Bedouin soldiers. He converted to Islam as soon as he was old enough according to Muslim customs. Afterwards, he was known outside his family as Faris Glubb. Faris had a sister Naomi, a Bedouin girl adopted in 1944 when she was three months old, and a sister Mary and brother John, who were Palestinian children adopted in 1948.

Glubb was sent to Wellington College, a "cane and bible" institution. Deeply unhappy, he ran away, to the Jordanian Embassy and the military attaché. He spent two years at Aiglon College in Switzerland, and then went to the School of Oriental and African Studies to study Arabic.

He became an activist with the Bertrand Russell Peace Foundation and the Popular Front for the Liberation of Oman, working with the Omani opposition at the United Nations in New York City.

== Career ==
Glubb reported from Beirut during the Lebanese Civil War, first for CBS and later for the Daily Mail as Michael O'Sullivan. He also reported for Arab news agencies. When the Israeli Government expelled the Palestinian leadership from Lebanon, Glubb followed. He had close relationships with the Popular Front for the Liberation of Palestine, and with the writer Ghassan Kanafani. He published several books, notably Zionism: Is It Racist?, The Palestine Question and International Law and Zionist Relations with Nazism. When he died, he was working for a doctorate in Arabic at the School of Oriental and African Studies about relationships between Richard the Lionheart and Saladin from Vatican documents.

== Death ==
He died in Kuwait on 3 April 2004 as the result of a hit-and-run road incident. He was survived by his second wife, Salwa and their two daughters Sarah and Darina, and his son Mark by his first marriage. His mother Lady Rosemary Glubb also survived him, but died in September 2005.
