= Norman Lash =

British police officer and military commander

Norman Oliver Lash

Personal details
- Born: 1908
- Died: 1960 (aged 51–52)
- Awards: Officer of the Order of the British Empire (1943); Third Class of the Supreme Order of the Renaissance (1947); Third Class of the Order of Independence (1943)

Military service
- Rank: Major General
- Commands: Arab Legion
- Battles/wars: 1948 Arab–Israeli War

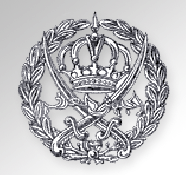
The Arab Legion Insignia

Norman Oliver Lash (1908–1960) OBE was a British police officer seconded to the Jordanian Arab Legion. On 15 May 1948, Brigadier Norman Lash was handed the field command of the operations of the Arab Legion in Palestine.

He appointed Abdullah el Tell to lead the offensive on Jerusalem during the 1948 Palestine war, the war for which he was criticised by many British officials for being the field commander of an Arab army. A representative of the British chief of staff, described Glubb Pasha, and his two senior aides, Norman Lash and Ronald Broadhurst as "Soldiers of fortune of British nationality" during the 1948 war.

Ironically, he was also criticised by Arab officers, as being more of a politician than a military leader. He negotiated the Jordanian-Israeli armistice agreement, that resulted in what came to be known as the green line. Norman Lash reached the rank of Major General, and was retired from Jordan's Arab Legion on 1 April 1951. He was replaced by Brigadier Sam Sidney Arthur Cooke of the Lincolnshire Regiment. According to Ma'an Abu Nawwar, an Arab officer in the Arab Legion Norman Lash had less experience as a soldier, compared to his successor Cooke.

== Honours ==
1943 – Officer of the Order of the British Empire (Military Division)

1947 – Third Class of the Supreme Order of the Renaissance

1943 – Third Class of the Order of Independence
