= Ali Abu Nuwar =

Jordanian army officer (1925–1991)

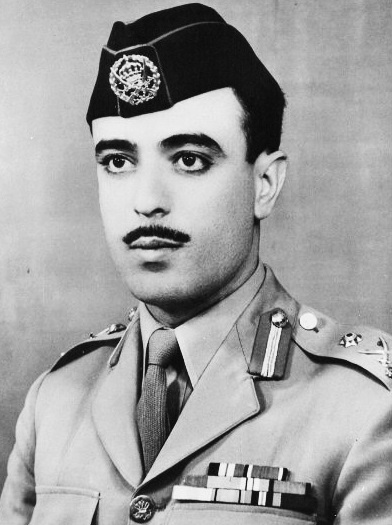
- Portrait of Abu Nuwar, 1956
- Born: 1925; Al-Salt, Emirate of Transjordan
- Died: August 15, 1991 (aged 65–66) London, United Kingdom
- Allegiance: Jordan
- Service years: 1946–1957
- Rank: Major General (March 1956 – April 1957); Lieutenant Colonel (November 1955 – March 1956); Lieutenant (1948 – November 1955)
- Commands: Artillery officer in Arab Legion (1946–1948); Military attaché to Paris (September 1952 – November 1955); Senior Aide-de-camp of King Hussein (November 1955 – May 1956); Chief of staff of Jordanian Armed Forces (May 1956 – April 1957)
- Conflicts: First Arab–Israeli War
- Other work: Senator in Parliament of Jordan (1989–1991); Jordanian Ambassador to France (February 1971–N/A)

Ali Abu Nuwar (Arabic: علي أبو نوار; surname also spelled Abu Nuwwar, Abu Nawar or Abu Nowar; 1925 – 15 August 1991) was a Jordanian military officer who served as chief of staff of the Jordanian Armed Forces from May 1956 to April 1957. He participated in the 1948 Arab–Israeli War as an artillery officer in the Jordanian army's predecessor, the Arab Legion, but his vocal opposition to British influence in Jordan led to his virtual exile to Paris as military attaché in 1952. There, he forged close ties with Jordanian crown prince Hussein, who promoted Abu Nuwar after his accession to the throne.

Abu Nuwar's enmity with Glubb Pasha, the Arab Legion's powerful British chief of staff, his insistence on establishing Arab command over the army and his influence with Hussein led the latter to dismiss Glubb Pasha and appoint Abu Nuwar in his place. However, Abu Nuwar's ardent support for the pan-Arabist policies of Egyptian president Gamal Abdel Nasser contributed to Jordan's increasing isolation from the UK and the US, which were major sources of foreign aid to Jordan. At the same time, existing dissatisfaction with Abu Nuwar's leadership by palace officials and veteran Bedouin army units culminated into violent confrontations at the large army barracks in Zarqa between royalist and Arab nationalist units. Two principal accounts emerged regarding the events at Zarqa, with the royalist version holding that the incident was an abortive coup by Abu Nuwar against Hussein, and the dissident version asserting that it was a staged, American-backed counter-coup by Hussein against the pan-Arabist movement in Jordan. In any case, Abu Nuwar resigned and was allowed to leave Jordan for Syria. He was subsequently sentenced to 15 years in absentia.

Abu Nuwar spent much of his time in exile between Syria and Egypt organizing opposition to Hussein and the monarchy, all the while maintaining his innocence in the Zarqa incident. He returned to Jordan in 1964 after being pardoned by Hussein as part of the latter's broader reconciliation efforts with his exiled opposition. In 1971, Abu Nuwar was made ambassador to France and he was later appointed to the Senate of Jordan's parliament in 1989. He died from blood cancer at a London hospital at age 66, one year after the publication of his memoirs, A Time of Arab Decline: Memoirs of Arab Politics (1948–1964).

== Early life ==
Ali Abu Nuwar was born in 1925 in al-Salt, Transjordan, which was then under British control. His father's family, the Abu Nuwar, was a prominent Arab clan in al-Salt. His mother was of Circassian descent. In his youth, Abu Nuwar was influenced by the discussions that his father and relatives held about the effects of the 1916 Arab Revolt, the 1917 Balfour Declaration and the 1920 Syrian Arab defeat at the Battle of Maysalun had on the fate of the Middle East. During the closing years of World War I, the Ottomans had been driven out of their Arab territories by an alliance of Hashemite-led Arab rebels and British forces, and were thereafter replaced by the British and French, who effectively occupied the Arab territories. Revolts and popular opposition against European rule in Palestine, Transjordan and elsewhere in the region emerged in the 1920s and 1930s. In his memoirs, Abu Nuwar recalled that his teachers in al-Salt would tell him and his classmates that the "Arab Nation was colonized and fragmented and that it was on the shoulders of our generation to take responsibility for freedom and unity".

== Military career ==
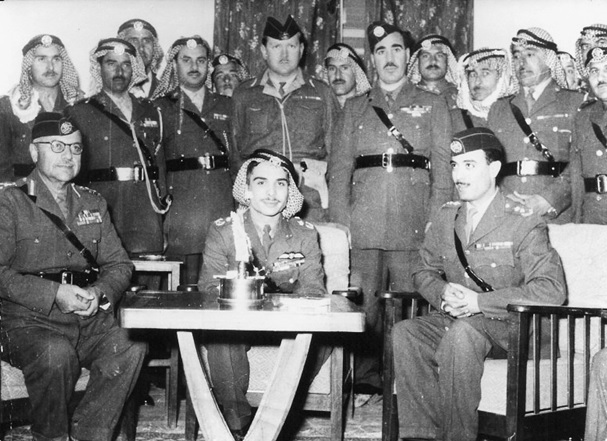
Aide-de-camp Abu Nuwar (seated right) with King Hussein (seated center) and Chief of Staff Glubb Pasha (seated left) with Arab Legion officers standing behind them, late 1955 or early 1956

Abu Nuwar joined the Arab Legion and was made an artillery officer in 1946, during the reign of Emir Abdullah I. During the 1948 Arab–Israeli War, he served as a lieutenant. Afterward, he received training in the British staff college of Camberly for two years before returning to Jordan, which was formed out of Transjordan and the West Bank as a result of the 1948 war. Israeli gains during the war had caused an upswing in anti-colonialist and Arab nationalist militancy among numerous officers in the Arab armies who blamed their political and military leadership for the Israeli victories. They considered the old guard incompetent, corrupt and beholden to the colonial powers. Among these incensed officers was Abu Nuwar. Although he was not a founder of the "Free Officers", a Baathist-affiliated underground organization of anti-British Jordanian officers, he joined the group after being invited in 1950, following his return to Jordan.

Abu Nuwar became a vociferous critic of British aid to Jordan, viewing it as a form of dependency on Jordan's former colonial ruler, and of Glubb Pasha, the influential British officer in charge of the Arab Legion who was derided by Arab nationalists as a symbol of lingering British colonialism in Jordan. When Abdullah I was assassinated in 1951, Glubb and Prime Minister Tawfik Abu al-Huda's government discussed preventing Abdullah's son and heir apparent, Emir Talal, a sympathizer of the Free Officers, from being enthroned; Talal had been checked into a mental institution in Switzerland, but many Free Officers believed the British were fabricating Talal's mental illness to keep him out of Jordan. In response, Abu Nuwar sought to install Talal on the throne by force, and to that end he appealed for support from the Free Officers and sent Awni Hannun, a Jordanian military doctor, to bring Talal to Jordan. However, Hannun was forbidden from meeting Talal due to visitation restrictions and was dismissed by Glubb for alleged incitement against British interests. Nonetheless, Talal was enthroned, and Abu Nuwar subsequently urged him to dismiss Glubb. The latter feared Abu Nuwar's efforts posed a threat to British interests in Jordan, and thus directed Abu al-Huda's government to effectively exile Abu Nuwar from the country. The government complied, dispatching Abu Nuwar to Paris to serve as Jordan's military attaché in September 1952. Talal was later dethroned by parliamentary decision on the basis of his mental incapacity.

During his assignment in Paris, Abu Nuwar met King Talal's son and successor, Crown Prince Hussein, who frequently visited the city during weekend breaks from his training at the Sandhurst Military Academy. Abu Nuwar was keen to gain Hussein's favor and disseminate to him Arab nationalist ideas calling for an end to British influence in the Jordanian military. Hussein was enthused by Abu Nuwar, and after his enthronement in May 1953, Hussein attempted to have Abu Nuwar return to Jordan despite Glubb's reservations. In August, Hussein visited London where he invited Abu Nuwar and other like-minded officers, including Free Officer Shahir Abu Shahut, to meet with him. There, Abu Shahut informed Abu Nuwar of the Free Officers' plans to "Arabize" the Arab Legion, i.e. remove the force's British leadership, including Glubb. Afterward, Abu Nuwar informed Hussein at a party celebrating his enthronement that he was a leading member of the Free Officers (though he was not) and communicated the group's desire to assert Arab command over the Arab Legion, an aim to which Hussein was receptive. Hussein was impressed by Abu Nuwar who vocally condemned the British presence in Jordan during the party, which earned Abu Nuwar cheers by Jordanian officers.

=== Aide-de-camp ===
After Hussein returned to Amman, he continued to press for Abu Nuwar's return to Jordan, but Glubb consistently stalled efforts to reassign Abu Nuwar. Later in 1953, Hussein sent Abu Nuwar to confer with the strongman of Egypt, Gamal Abdel Nasser, who had recently toppled his country's pro-British monarchy. In 1954, Abu Nuwar was briefly brought to Amman for consultations with Hussein. Hussein ultimately bypassed Glubb and had Abu Nuwar permanently reassigned to Jordan in November 1955. Abu Nuwar arrived amid growing anti-British upheaval. In a meeting between Glubb and Abu Nuwar, Glubb made clear his displeasure with Hussein's decision and threatened "shorten his [Abu Nuwar's] life" if he incited against British interests in the country. After being informed of the meeting, Hussein appointed Abu Nuwar as his senior aide-de-camp (ADC). Abu Nuwar was also promoted to lieutenant-colonel.

As ADC, Abu Nuwar was a major influence over then-20 year old Hussein and was constantly at his side, advising Hussein to dismiss Glubb and sever ties with the British. Hussein was also influenced by other Arab nationalist officers and personalities, including his cousin Zaid ibn Shaker, and the increasingly anti-imperialist and Arab nationalist political atmosphere in the country. As a sign of his increasing nationalism and as a means to quiet political opposition to his rule, Hussein decided to dismiss Glubb. He coordinated with Abu Nuwar and other Free Officers to ensure that his impending dismissal of Glubb would not result in a revolt by the latter's supporters within the Arab Legion. Thus, on 28 February 1956, Abu Nuwar was instructed to ready his troops, and he subsequently posted Free Officers at the Amman Airport, the major army base at Zarqa and in the vicinity of Glubb Pasha's Amman residence. After Abu Nuwar's positions were confirmed to him, Hussein conferred with his cabinet and dismissed Glubb on 1 March. Glubb complied with the order and departed Jordan the following day. Hussein then promoted Abu Nuwar to major-colonel and appointed Major General Radi Annab to Glubb's former position as chief of staff of the Arab Legion, which was concurrently renamed the Jordanian Armed Forces.

=== Chief of staff ===
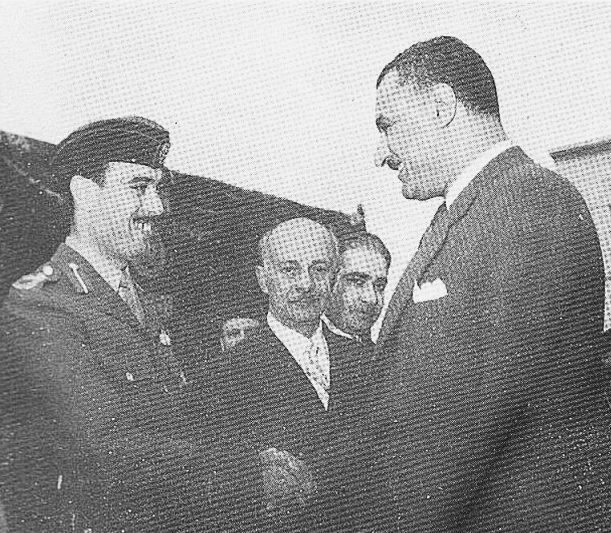
Abu Nuwar shaking hands with Egyptian President Gamal Abdel Nasser (right) in Egypt, 1956. Abu Nuwar was an advocate of Nasser's pan-Arabist policies.

On 24 May, Abu Nuwar was appointed as Chairman of the Joint Chiefs of Staff following Annab's retirement. Glubb's dismissal was met with great enthusiasm among Jordan's inhabitants and Arab nationalists in and outside of the country. However, Abu Nuwar's ascendancy as head of the army was resented by its veteran Bedouin units; he was generally regarded as a competent staff officer, but did not have experience as a commander. As part of his efforts to modernize the army, he mandated that education was a prerequisite for advancement, an act which disproportionately affected Bedouin officers, many of whom lacked formal education. As a result of Abu Nuwar's measure, several senior Bedouin officers were retired or reassigned to non-command posts. To counterbalance opposition to him within the army's ranks, Abu Nuwar established the Fourth Infantry Brigade, which mostly consisted of Palestinians, who he believed would form an integral part of his power base within the military. Abu Nuwar's appointment also contributed to the increasing deterioration of ties between Jordan and the British government.

As chief of staff, Abu Nuwar embraced many of the pan-Arabist and anti-imperialist ideas of Nasser, who became president of Egypt in 1956. Abu Nuwar communicated his support for Nasser and the Arab nationalist Ba'ath Party, which was active in Syria and Jordan, during a meeting with Lebanese president and Nasser opponent, Camille Chamoun, in 1956. An American embassy official in Jordan remarked that during a discussion with Abu Nuwar, the latter "out-Nassered Nasser". He was regarded as an "ultranationalist" by the Central Intelligence Agency (CIA). According to historian Ivan Pearson, American diplomatic and intelligence views were colored by the negative perceptions of Abu Nuwar in Israel and Abu Nuwar's role in the dismissal of Prime Minister Samir al-Rifai in May; Rifai was seen by the Israelis as a counterbalance to Hussein's Arab nationalist advisers, and Abu Nuwar maneuvered to sideline Rifai soon after Glubb's dismissal. Abu Nuwar was a major opponent of Iraq's Hashemite rulers (relatives of Hussein) and that country's pro-British prime minister, Nuri al-Said. Abu Nuwar's opposition was driven by suspicions that the Iraqis sought to oust him from his military post, while Iraqi regent Abd al-Ilah and prime minister al-Said regarded Abu Nuwar with suspicion. Abu Nuwar's influence with Hussein was likely a major reason Jordan resisted Iraqi attempts to merge the two Hashemite-ruled countries.

=== Suez Crisis ===
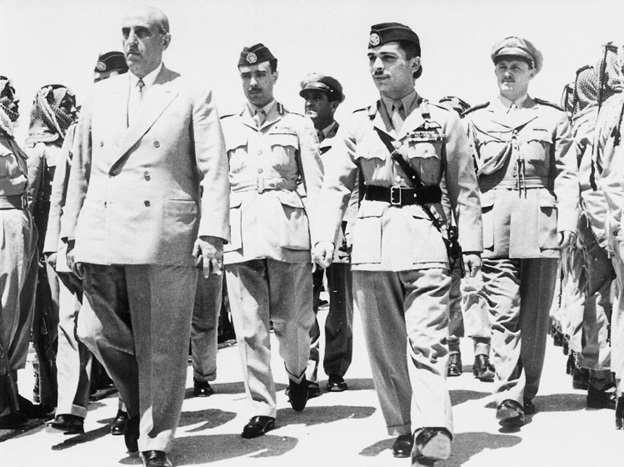
Abu Nowar, as Chief of Staff, walking between Hussein and Syrian president Shukri al-Quwatli in late 1956

In late 1956, parliamentary elections in Jordan resulted in major victories for Arab nationalist and other left-leaning parties. Hussein subsequently appointed Suleiman Nabulsi, an Arab nationalist, socialist and one of the leading pro-Nasser MP-elects, as prime minister in October. Roughly coinciding with Nabulsi's appointment, the British, French and Israelis launched a tripartite invasion of the Suez Canal and the Sinai Peninsula of Egypt, mainly in response to Nasser's nationalization of the Suez Canal Company among other reasons. Hussein declared a state of emergency and his opposition against the invasion and agreed to Egyptian chief of staff Abdel Hakim Amer's request for Jordanian military intervention. To that end, Hussein instructed Abu Nuwar to immediately launch Operation Beisan, which entailed a Jordanian-Syrian armored invasion of the Israeli coastal plain, which was seen as Israel's most vulnerable region due to the short length between the coast and the Jordanian-held West Bank. However, Abu Nuwar viewed the operation as far too risky for the Jordanian army and advised Hussein to await Syria's adherence to the plan; Egypt, Syria and Jordan had formed a defense pact days before the Israeli occupation of Sinai on 29 October.

Nabulsi also hesitated to abide by Hussein's orders, prompting a meeting of Hussein, Abu Nuwar and the Jordanian cabinet to assess the situation. According to then-Public Works Minister Anwar al-Khatib's recollections, Abu Nuwar argued that his troops would quickly lose control of the Hebron and Nablus regions to Israel, but would "defend Jerusalem to the last man and the last drop of blood". Hussein's eagerness to aid Egypt was tempered by Abu Nuwar's assessment, but he only relented in his attempted intervention after Nasser communicated to Hussein appreciation of his genuine support and a warning not to risk losing the Jordanian army to the far stronger Israeli military. Later in his life, Abu Nuwar had stated that he had been ready "to give the Israelis a very rough time" in 1956, but only dissuaded Hussein when Nasser counseled the king against intervention, after which Abu Nuwar told Hussein that attacking Israel while the Egyptians had withdrawn from Sinai "would be suicide".

During the Suez Crisis, Hussein requested that Syria, Saudi Arabia and Iraq send troops to Jordan as a precautionary measure to prevent a potential invasion of the country by the tripartite allies. Prime Minister al-Said was reticent to put Iraqi troops under Abu Nuwar's command and suggested that Abu Nuwar be dismissed as a prerequisite to any deployment of troops to Jordan. This did not occur, but the Iraqis nonetheless sent troops to Jordan. However, their deployment was opposed by Nabulsi on the grounds that Iraq was a member of the Baghdad Pact, an alliance of Middle Eastern countries with the UK that was condemned by Arab nationalists as a British-led attempt to stifle pan-Arab unity, instead of the Egyptian-Jordanian-Syrian-Saudi alliance known as the "Amman Pact". Despite Hussein's protestations, Nabulsi, using his prerogative as head of the government, succeeded in forcing the Iraqis' withdrawal by the end of November.

=== Support for pan-Arab unity ===
On 19 January 1957, Jordan signed the Arab Solidarity Agreement (ASA) with Saudi Arabia, Egypt and Syria which entailed those countries' financial assistance to replace the annual British aid to Jordan that ended with the abrogation of the Anglo-Jordanian Treaty in November 1956 (the treaty was officially and mutually abrogated in March 1957). However, implementation of the ASA was hindered by Egypt and Syria's inability or unwillingness to subsidize the Jordanian army, whose budget rivaled that of their own armies. Furthermore, by then, Abu Nuwar was steadily losing Hussein's confidence due to dissatisfaction with Abu Nuwar among the army brass and the negative effects that his anti-Western hostility was having on relations with Jordan's principal Western allies, the UK and US; Hussein viewed the latter two as much-needed alternatives of financial support to Jordan in lieu of his disappointment with the ASA.

Meanwhile, serious divisions emerged in the Jordanian state over reactions to the Eisenhower Doctrine, which ostensibly aimed to stem Soviet expansion in the Middle East, but was viewed by Arab nationalists as a neo-colonialist ploy to control the region. Nabulsi and Foreign Minister Abdullah Rimawi, a Baathist, led the camp opposing the doctrine as a threat to Arab sovereignty and as means to control the region's oil assets and support Israel, while Hussein publicly embraced the doctrine as a preventive measure against growing communist influence in the country. Prior to these disagreements, Nabulsi had been clamping down on communist literature and influence in the press (the communists were generally opposed by Arab nationalists), whilst attempting to establish diplomatic relations with the Soviet Union without Hussein's knowledge. To that end, he dispatched Abu Nuwar to Moscow in February 1957 to serve as an initial contact with the Soviets. Later, Nabulsi publicly declared his intention to establish relations with the USSR and pursue a political union with Egypt and Syria, and requested from Hussein a confirmation of his dismissal of several royalist officials. Hussein responded by forcing Nabulsi to resign on 10 April 1957.

=== Alleged coup attempt and resignation ===
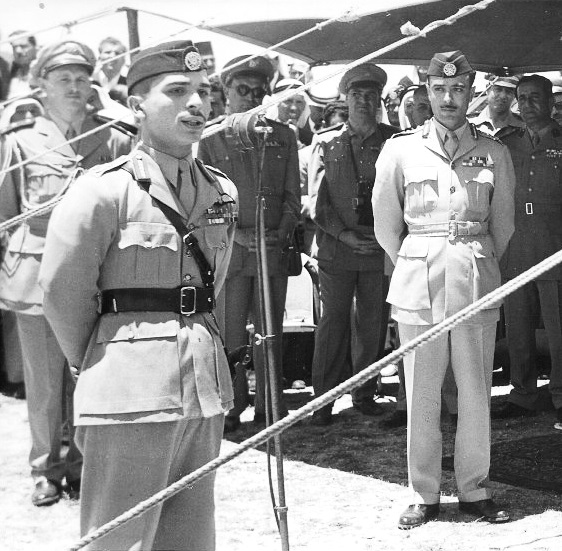
King Hussein addressing Jordanian troops as Chief of Staff Abu Nuwar observes, sometime in 1956.

Amid the political chaos in Jordan and two days before Nabulsi's resignation, an army unit from the First Armoured Brigade commanded by Captain Nadhir Rashid engaged in a maneuver, named Operation Hashem in honor of the Hashemite royal family, at the major intersections of Amman. The move raised Hussein's suspicions and prompted him to order Abu Nuwar to withdraw the unit, which he did. Hussein believed the move was a presage to an impending coup. Abu Nuwar sought to allay Hussein's concerns and told him it was a routine exercise executed numerous times in the preceding years to monitor the traffic into and out of the city, while Rashid later claimed it was part of a broader contingency plan to move troops to the West Bank in the event of an Israeli invasion. According to Pearson, Rashid's maneuver was meant to intimidate Hussein, while historian Betty Anderson has speculated that the "officers could have been testing the waters to see what they could achieve militarily". Whatever the actual reason for the maneuver, it heightened Hussein's suspicions of a coup by Abu Nuwar and the Arab nationalists, and it prompted warnings from veteran royalist officials, namely Bahjat al-Talhouni and Sharif Naser, that such a coup was impending.

On 13 April, rioting broke out at the army barracks in Zarqa, which contained the largest concentration of troops in the country, between mostly hadari (non-Bedouin) units loyal to Abu Nuwar and Bedouin-dominated units loyal to Hussein. Two main accounts emerged regarding this incident, known as the "Zarqa uprising" among other names, with one account having been advanced by Hussein and Western historiographers and the other by political dissidents and many in the Jordanian and Arab press. Pearson has said the "incident is steeped in mystery and persistent controversy", and Anderson likewise has written that "questions abound about whether this coup attempt originated with the military, led by Abu Nuwar and the Free Officers, or with the king and the Americans, who wanted an excuse to remove" the Arab nationalist movement "from Jordan's political scene".

According to Hussein's account of the events, Abu Nuwar and the Free Officers had planned for the Bedouin-dominated First Infantry Regiment in Zarqa to participate in a training exercise in the desert without ammunition to render it unavailable for Hussein to use against a planned anti-government demonstration scheduled to be held by Nabulsi on 14 April. Hussein was still wary of Nabulsi due to an alleged intercept of a message from Nasser imploring Nabulsi to resist his dismissal from the premiership. Hussein was informed of the Free Officers' alleged plot by Sharif Naser and Bedouin officers from Zarqa on the evening of 13 April. The incident coincided with a delivery by Abu Nuwar of an ultimatum to Prime Minister Said al-Mufti (Nabulsi's successor) warning Hussein to appoint a government reflecting the will of the elected parliament or face an army revolt. Al-Mufti apparently broke down emotionally in Hussein's presence, prompting the latter to inquire from Abu Nuwar about the ultimatum, to which Abu Nuwar professed his surprise. Hussein then brought Abu Nuwar along with him to inspect the scene at Zarqa, where Hussein was told by loyalist officers from Zarqa that rumors of his death had provoked heavy clashes between his loyalists and those of Abu Nuwar and that only the physical presence of Hussein would put an end to the fighting. Moreover, Hussein was told that Rashid and Ma'an Abu Nuwar (a distant cousin of Abu Nuwar) had been ordered to Amman to besiege the royal palace and arrest Hussein.

Both accounts agree that the during the fighting in al-Zarqa, numerous Free Officers were rounded up and arrested by loyalist Bedouin officers. Both accounts also agree that as Hussein made his way into Zarqa, he was cheered on by loyalist soldiers and he intervened in the middle of the clashes at his own risk and was emotionally embraced by his supporters, who chanted "Death to Abu Nuwar and all the traitors!" Abu Nuwar remained in the car, fearful for his life by Hussein's loyalist troops and he then apparently begged Hussein to protect him and allow him to return to Amman, which Hussein agreed to. By nightfall, Abu Nuwar persuaded Hussein to allow him to leave the country and on the morning of 14 March, he officially resigned and departed for Damascus, Syria with his family.

Major-General Ali al-Hiyari, Abu Nuwar's chief rival in the Jordanian army, was appointed as Abu Nuwar's replacement, but on 20 April, he defected to Syria. Al-Hiyari claimed that prior to the incident at Zarqa and shortly after the forced resignation of al-Nabulsi's cabinet, palace officials had canvassed the army general staff to inquire about the officers' opinions regarding a change in direction of the new government away from the pan-Arabist policies of Egypt and Syria. Accordingly, when Abu Nuwar and the Free Officers voiced their refusal "to use the army against" the popular will in the country, palace officials laid out plans to royalist officers, including al-Hiyari, for a false flag operation at Zarqa. Al-Hiyari's account was widely reported throughout Jordan and the Arab world, and despite dismissal of the account by palace officials, it led to further public skepticism toward the official version of events regarding the alleged coup plot.

Abu Nuwar consistently denied any betrayal of Hussein and claimed he was a "fall man", the victim of political intrigue in the kingdom in which his rivals sought to discredit him. At a press conference in Damascus, he stated that the entire incident was an overreaction by Hussein to sensational and false reports of a coup plot and that the incident was likely a preemptive coup by Hussein and the old guard, supported or engineered by US intelligence, against the main proponents of pan-Arab unity in Jordan. Rashid and Ma'an Abu Nuwar likewise strongly denied any kind of coup plot on their end. According to Pearson, the accounts of the Free Officers and al-Hiyari were lent further credence by the lack of evidence in the military trials against the alleged conspirators who were arrested, the light sentences that they were given and the eventual rehabilitation of the alleged conspirators, including Abu Nuwar, who were later reassigned to high-ranking posts in the state and military.

== Later career ==
On 22 April, Abu Nuwar issued a radio statement from the Cairo-based Voice of the Arabs radio station denouncing Hussein. In coordination with Abu Nuwar, the following day, a Patriotic Congress composed of Hussein's opposition was held in Nablus in the West Bank demanding major palace officials be dismissed, expulsion of the American ambassador and military attaché, rejection of the Eisenhower Doctrine, federal unity with Egypt and Syria and reinstatement of the dismissed army officers, including Abu Nuwar. As a result of the congress, Hussein put Nablus, East Jerusalem and Amman under military curfew, dissolved political parties, imposed press censorship, dismissed municipal councils in the West Bank in favor of military governors, disbanded Palestinian-dominated army units, arrested al-Nabulsi (who had since been made foreign minister) and dismissed the cabinet of Prime Minister Fakhri al-Khalidi. Although he eventually relaxed some of these measures, namely military curfews and severe press censorship, Hussein's moves significantly curtailed the constitutional democracy that existed in Jordan in the mid-1950s.

On 26 September 1957, Abu Nuwar, Rimawi and al-Hiyari were sentenced to 15 years imprisonment in absentia. During his exile from Jordan, Abu Nuwar initially resided in Damascus, along with other Jordanian dissidents, including al-Hiyari and Rimawi. However, in 1958, Abu Nuwar moved to Egypt following that country's union with Syria forming the United Arab Republic (UAR) under Nasser's presidency (Syria seceded in 1961). Thenceforth, Abu Nuwar lived much of the remainder of his exile in Cairo. In 1958, under the aegis of the UAR and with assistance from the head of Syrian intelligence, Abd al-Hamid al-Sarraj, the Jordanian dissidents in exile formed the Jordanian Revolutionary Council. It consisted of Jordanian Baathists, left-leaning politicians and dissident army officers, including Abu Nuwar, al-Hiyari and Abdullah al-Tal, a friend of Abu Nuwar who had been exiled by Hussein before him. The group attempted to recruit university students in Jordan to form the vanguard of the nationalist movement in the country, funded the smuggling of weapons to Palestinian dissidents in the West Bank and the refugee camps around Amman, financially assisted Jordanian officers and politicians dismissed by Hussein, and organized assassination attempts against leading royalist politicians, including al-Rifai, Talhouni and Hazza al-Majali. There were disputes between al-Tal and Abu Nuwar over leadership of the group.

In April 1963, Abu Nuwar declared a government in exile in the name of the Jordanian Republic and disseminated propaganda through his own radio station. The following year, or in 1965, Abu Nuwar returned to Jordan after being pardoned by Hussein as part of a broader reconciliation with exiled dissidents in a bid to co-opt opposition to his rule. In February 1971, Abu Nuwar was appointed Jordan's ambassador to France. In the 1989 Jordanian parliamentary election, Abu Nuwar was appointed by Hussein to the senate, the Jordanian Parliament's upper house. Abu Nuwar's memoirs, A Time of Arab Decline: Memoirs of Arab Politics (1948–1964), were published in London in 1990. Abu Nuwar suffered from blood cancer in his later years, and he died in a London hospital on 15 August 1991, at the age of 66. He was still in office when he died.

== Bibliography ==
- Anderson, Betty Signe (2005). Nationalist Voices in Jordan: The Street and the State. University of Texas Press. ISBN 978-0-292-70625-5.
- Dann, Uriel (1989). King Hussein and the Challenge of Arab Radicalism. Oxford University Press. ISBN 978-0-19-536121-6.
- Massad, Joseph Andoni (2001). Colonial Effects: The Making of National Identity in Jordan. Columbia University Press. ISBN 978-0-231-12322-8.
- Pappe, Ilan (1994). "The State and the Tribe: Egypt and Jordan, 1948–88". In Nevo, Joseph; Pappe, Ilan (eds.). Jordan in the Middle East: The Making of a Pivotal State, 1948–1988. Frank Cass & Co. Ltd. ISBN 978-0-7146-3454-8.
- Pearson, Ivan L. G. (2010). In the Name of Oil: Anglo-American Relations in the Middle East, 1950–1958. Sussex Academic Press. ISBN 978-1-84519-388-1.
- Shlaim, Avi (2007). Lion of Jordan: The Life of King Hussein in War and Peace. Vintage Books. ISBN 978-1-4000-7828-8.
- Yitzhak, Ronen (2012). Abdullah Al-Tall, Arab Legion Officer: Arab Nationalism and Opposition to the Hashemite Regime. Sussex Academic Press. ISBN 978-1-84519-408-6.
