= Desert Force =

Paramilitary force of Transjordan

The Desert Force (Arabic: قوات البادية, English: Al-Badia Force), also known as the Desert Patrol, was a paramilitary force of Transjordan. Its main task was to guard Jordanian borders with neighboring Iraq, Saudi Arabia and Syria as well as to provide protection for oil pipelines of the Iraq Petroleum Company (IPC). It also participated in campaigns of Syria and Iraq during World War II.

== History ==
The Desert Patrol was formed as a semi-independent part of the Arab Legion in February 1931 by Glubb Pasha to secure Transjordan's desert region of the country, effectively everything east of the cultivated area that formed Trans-Jordan's western border with Mandatory Palestine. The patrol replaced the Trans-Jordan Frontier Force in the desert. Initially it had 20 men in four trucks with Lewis and Vickers machine guns. Additional men were located in small forts throughout the region and relied on camels for mobility. Glubb recruited mainly Bedouins for the Patrol and helped establish strong links between the Bedouin and the monarchy that survive today. The remaining four-fifths of the Arab Legion at this time were police and gendarmerie serving in the cultivated area. Over the next five to ten years, Glubb successfully pacified the tribes.

Between 1936 and 1939, forces were expanded in response to threats posed by the Arab Revolt in Palestine and civil disturbances in Syria. The Patrol now consisted of 350 Bedouins organised into two truck mounted companies.

The Patrol formed the basis of the Mechanized regiment of the Arab Legion.
