= Suleiman Nabulsi's cabinet =

- 1956-1957
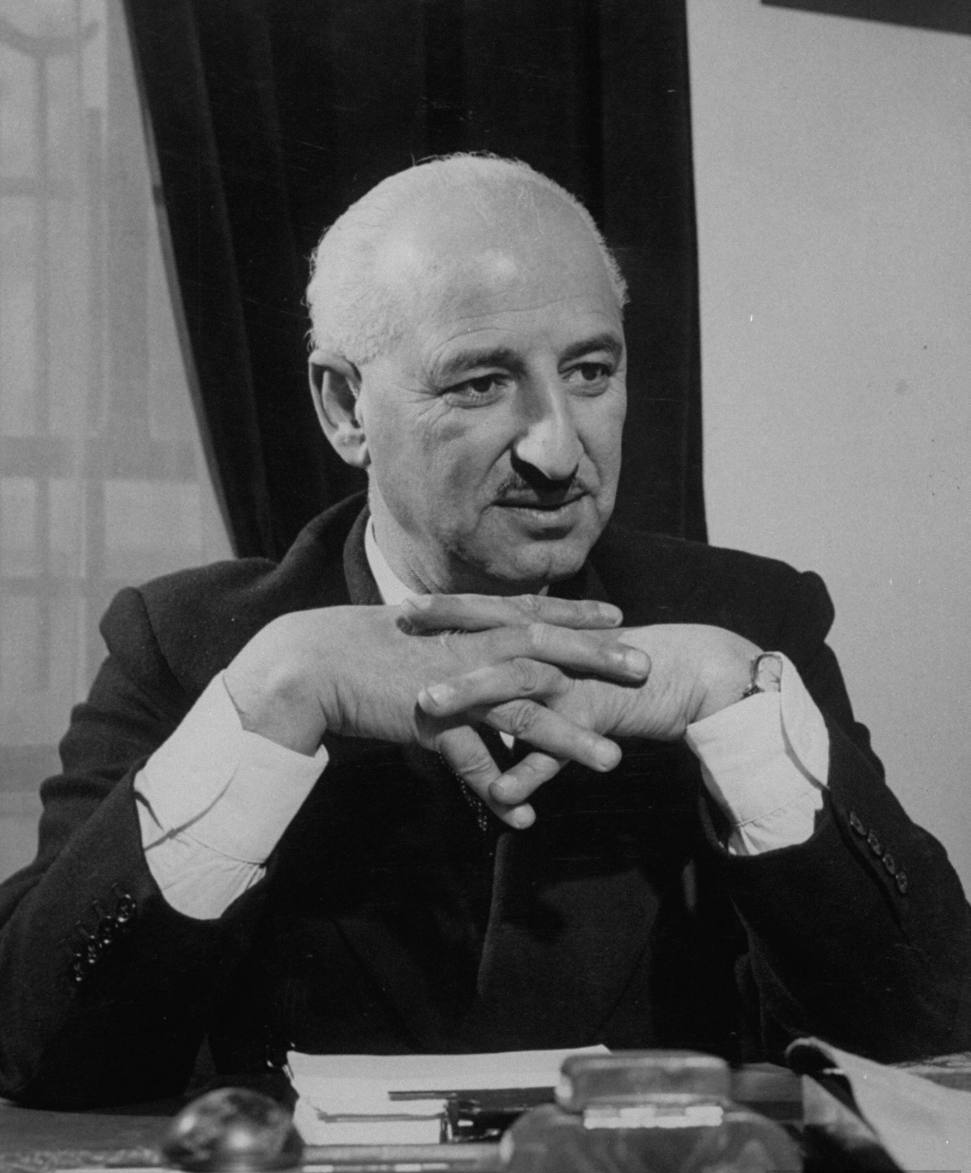
- Suleiman Nabulsi
- Date formed: 29 October 1956
- Date dissolved: 10 April 1957

People and organisations
- Head of state: King Hussein
- Head of government: Suleiman Nabulsi
- No. of ministers: 11
- Member party: National Socialist Party
- Status in legislature: Majority

History
- Election: 1956 general election
- Legislature term: 10th Parliament (4 years)
- Predecessor: Fourth cabinet of Hashim
- Successor: First cabinet of Al-Khalidi

The 1956 election for the lower House of Representatives was held on 21 October in Jordan. The election witnessed the emergence of the National Socialist Party (NSP) as the party with the greatest number of seats—12 out of 40. Thus, King Hussein asked Suleiman Nabulsi (leader of the party) to form a government.

Nabulsi's cabinet, Jordan's only elected parliamentary government, lasted from October 1956 till April 1957. It was forced to resign on 10 April 1957 by senior royalist officials after its policies frequently clashed with that of the Palace. Ali Abu Nuwar, a nationalist army chief of staff who was said to have sympathized with Nabulsi's ousting, was alleged to have arranged a coup attempt on 13 April.

The Cabinet consisted of 11 ministers: seven ministers from the NSP, one from the Arab Socialist Ba'ath Party, one from the Communist Party, and two independents.

== Cabinet ==
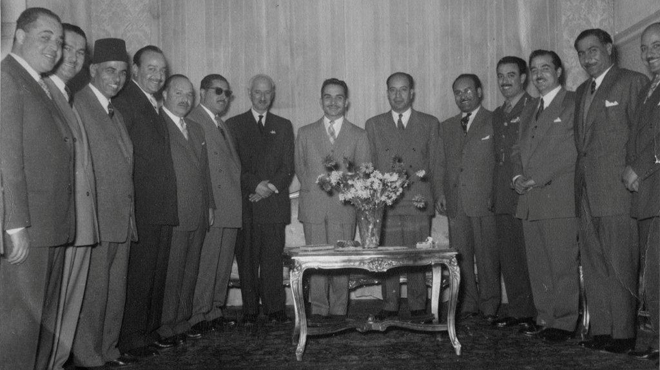
King Hussein, Ali Abu Nuwar (Army Chief of staff) and Nabulsi's cabinet celebrating the annulment of the 1948 Anglo-Jordanian treaty, sometime in March 1957.

Minister	Office	Party
Suleiman Nabulsi	Prime Minister	National Socialist Party
Abdel Haleem Nimir	Minister of Interior and Minister of Defence	National Socialist Party
Anwar Khateeb	Minister of Public Works	National Socialist Party
Shafeeq Irsheidat	Minister of Justice and Minister of Education	National Socialist Party
Na'eem Abdel Hadi	Minister of Economy	National Socialist Party
Saleh Muasher	Minister of Health	National Socialist Party
Salah Touqan	Minister of Finance	National Socialist Party
Abdullah Rimawi	Minister of Foreign Affairs	Arab Socialist Ba'ath Party
Abdel Qader Al-Saleh	Minister of Agriculture	Communist Party
Sam'an Daoud	Minister of Construction	Independent
Saleh Majali	Minister of Transportation	Independent

== See also ==
- 1957 alleged Jordanian military coup

Preceded by Fourth cabinet of Hashim	Cabinet of Jordan; October 1956 – April 1957	Succeeded by First cabinet of Al-Khalidi
