= Shaher Abu Shahout =

Jordanian Military Commander

Shaher Abu Shahout Lieutenant colonel
- شاهر أبو شحوت
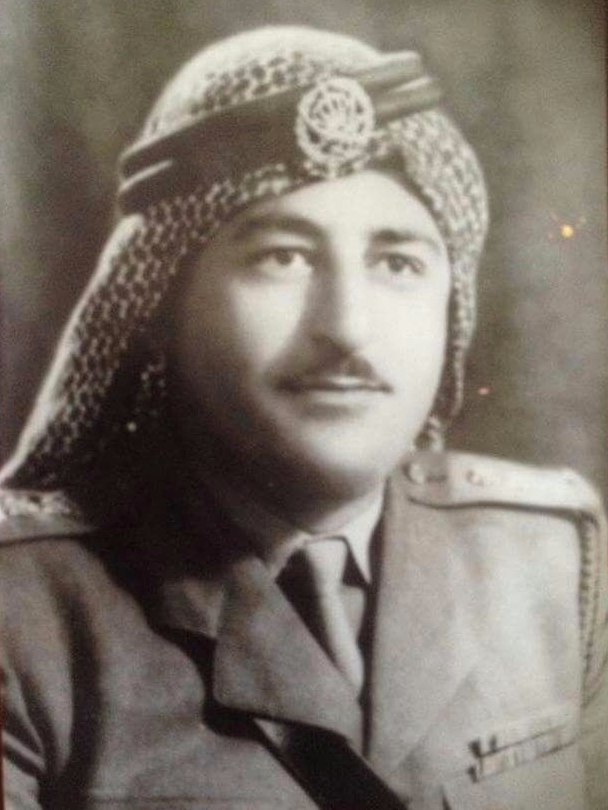

Personal details
- Born: 17 January 1926 Al-Salt, Jordan
- Died: 12 November 1989 (aged 63) Amman, Jordan
- Party: National Command of the Arab Socialist Ba'ath Party

Shaher Yousef Fayyad Abu Shahout (Arabic: شاهر يوسف فَيَّاض أبو شحوت, Šāhr Ywsf Fyَّāḍ Abw Šḥwt; 17 January 1926 – 12 November 1989) also known as Abu Jabar, was a Jordanian officer who contributed to the founding of the Jordanian Free Officers Movement in 1951 and led it until 1957. In 1956, Abu Shahout was also Commander of the Jordanian Armed Forces and then Commander of the Hashemite Brigade a year after as Lieutenant Colonel.

Abu Shahout was accused of attempting to overthrow the monarchy and sentenced to ten years of prison. He was released in 1964 following a general amnesty, seven years into his prison sentence. He contributed to the founding the Arab Liberation Front and assumed its military leadership in 1969. He resided in the Iraqi capital Baghdad from 1970 to 1975, where he worked as the director of the Palestine Armed Struggle Command in the National Command of the Arab Socialist Ba'ath Party. He suffered a stroke in 1978, which resulted in hemiplegia on the left side. Upon retiring, he lived in his home in Amman until the time of his death.
