= 1956 Jordanian general election =

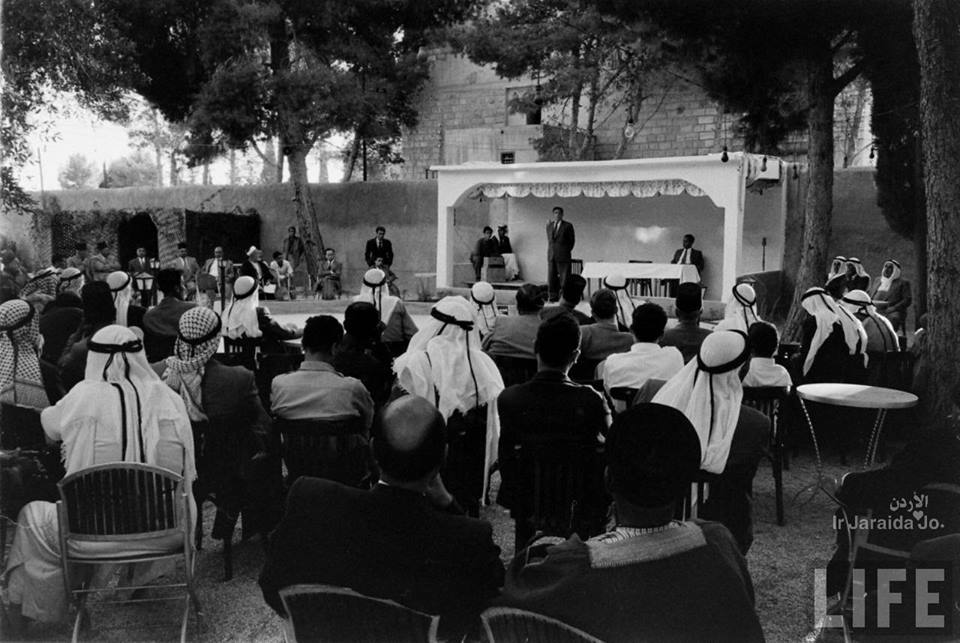
An election rally in Amman during the 1956 election campaign.

General elections were held in Jordan on 21 October 1956. The National Socialist Party emerged as the largest party, with 12 seats.

The elections were considered to be one of the most free in Jordan's history, and was the first and only election to produce an elected government. Hizb ut-Tahrir, which won a single seat, was later banned.

== Results ==
Party	Seats	+/–
National Socialist Party	12	New
Arab Constitutional Party	8	New
Muslim Brotherhood	4	New
Communist Party	3	New
Arab Socialist Ba'ath Party	2	New
Hizb ut-Tahrir	1	New
Independents	10	–28
Total	40	0
Source: Tal

== See also ==
- Suleiman Nabulsi's cabinet
