= John Bagot Glubb =

British military officer and author (1897–1986)

Lieutenant-General Sir John Bagot Glubb KCB CMG DSO OBE MC KStJ KPM
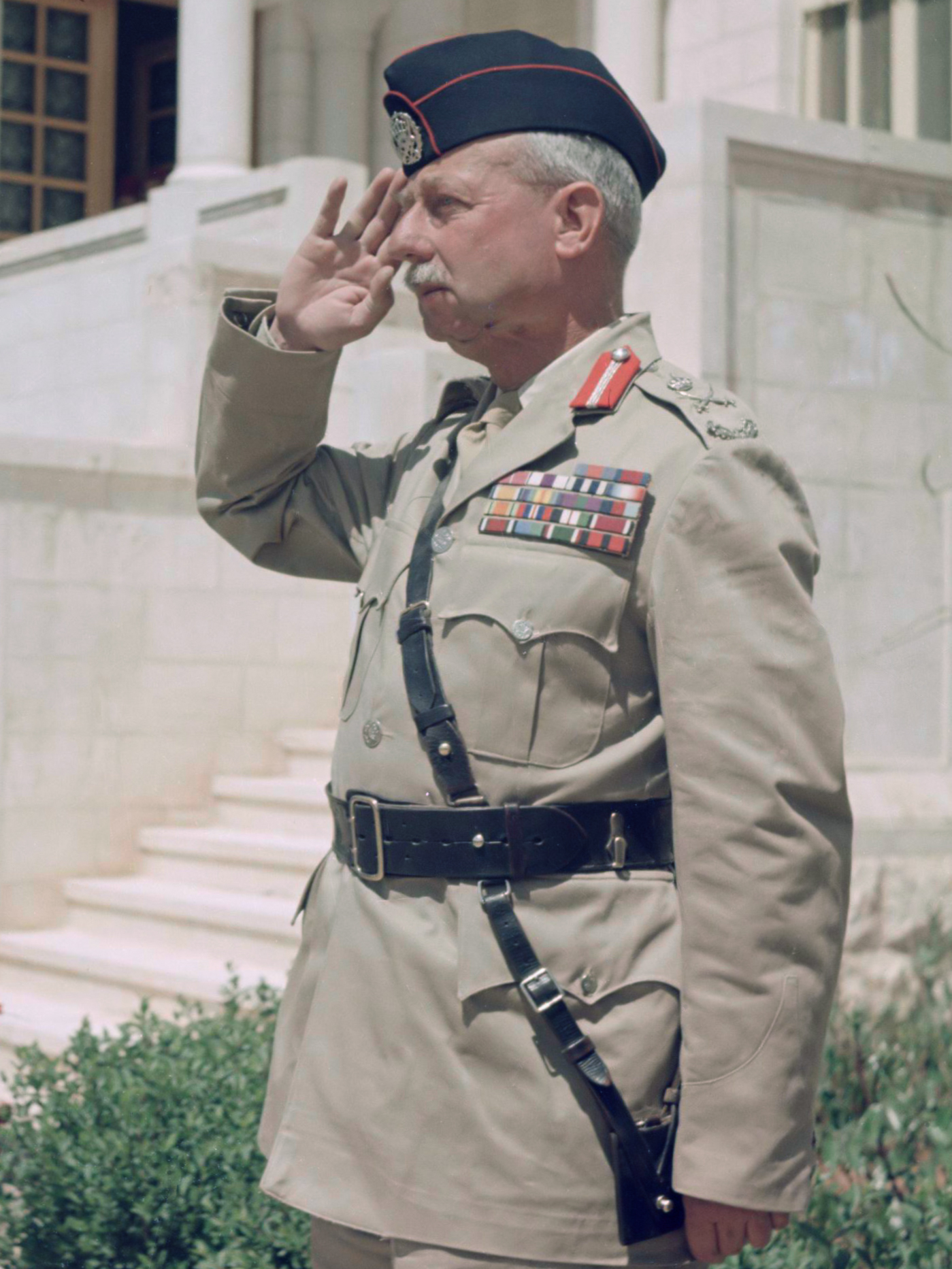
- Glubb in 1953
- Born: 16 April 1897; Preston, Lancashire, England
- Died: 17 March 1986 (aged 88); Mayfield, East Sussex, England
- Children: Godfrey Peter Manley Glubb, known as Faris Glubb
- Military career
- Allegiance: United Kingdom; Emirate of Transjordan; Hashemite Kingdom of Jordan
- Service years: 1915–1956
- Rank: Lieutenant-General
- Nickname: Glubb Pasha
- Unit: Royal Engineers
- Commands: Arab Legion
- Conflicts: First World War; Western Front; Ikhwan revolt; Second World War; Middle Eastern theatre; Anglo-Iraqi War; Syria–Lebanon Campaign; 1948 Arab–Israeli War
- Awards: Knight Commander of the Order of the Bath; Companion of the Order of St Michael and St George; Distinguished Service Order; Officer of the Order of the British Empire
- Other work: Author

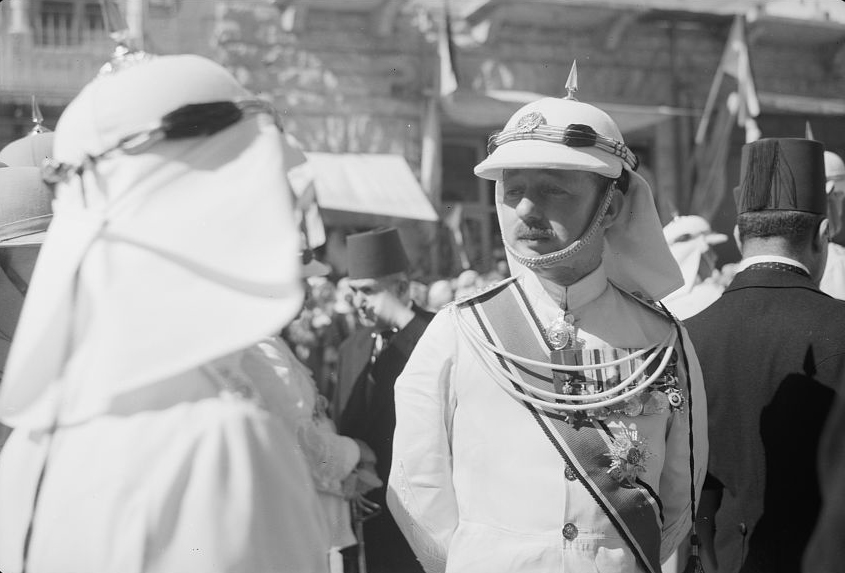
Glubb Pasha in Amman in 1940

Sir John Bagot Glubb KCB CMG DSO OBE MC KStJ KPM (16 April 1897 – 17 March 1986), also known as Glubb Pasha (Arabic: كلوب باشا) and Abu Hunayk (by the Jordanians), was a British military officer who led and trained Transjordan's Arab Legion between 1939 and 1956 as its commanding general. He served in World War I, the Ikhwan revolt, World War II and the 1948 Arab–Israeli War.

== Early life and start of military service ==
Glubb was born in Preston, Lancashire, and educated at Cheltenham College. Glubb's father was Major-General Sir Frederic Manley Glubb, of Lancashire, who had been chief engineer in the British Second Army during the First World War. His mother was Letitia Bagot from County Roscommon, Ireland. He was a brother of the racing driver Gwenda Hawkes.

Glubb gained a commission in the Royal Engineers in 1915. On the Western Front of World War I, he suffered a shattered jaw. In later years, this would lead to his Arab nickname of Abu Hunaik, meaning "the father of the little jaw". In 1920, he was transferred to Iraq, which Britain had started governing under a League of Nations Mandate following the war. In 1922, he was posted to Ramadi "to maintain a rickety floating bridge over the river Euphrates, carried on boats made of reeds daubed with bitumen", as he later put it.

== Arab Legion ==
He became an officer of the Arab Legion, subsequently known as the Jordanian Armed Forces, in 1930. In 1931, he formed the Desert Patrol, a force consisting exclusively of Bedouin to curb the raiding problem that plagued the southern part of Jordan. Within a few years he had persuaded the Bedouin to abandon their habit of raiding neighbouring tribes. He also took part in suppressing the Ikhwan revolt.

In 1939, Glubb succeeded Frederick G. Peake as the commander of the Arab Legion. During this period, he transformed the Legion into the best-trained force in the Arab world. During World War II he led attacks on Axis-aligned Arab forces in Iraq, and on Vichy forces in Lebanon and Syria.

In 1938, Glubb married Muriel Rosemary Forbes, the daughter of physician James Graham Forbes. The couple had a son, Godfrey Peter Manley (known as Faris Glubb), named after the Crusader King Godfrey of Bouillon, born in Jerusalem in 1939. Another son was born in May 1940 but lived only a few days. In 1944, they adopted Naomi, a Bedouin girl who was then three months old. In 1948, they adopted two Palestinian refugee children called Atalla, renamed John and Mary.

During the 1948 Arab–Israeli War, the Arab Legion was considered the strongest Arab army involved in the war. In May 1948, Glubb led the Arab Legion across the River Jordan to occupy the West Bank. Despite some negotiation and understanding between the Jewish Agency and King Abdullah, severe fighting took place in Kfar Etzion (May 1948), Jerusalem and Latrun (May–July 1948). According to Avi Shlaim,

Rumours that Abdullah was once again in contact with the Jewish leaders further damaged his standing in the Arab world. His many critics suggested that he was prepared to compromise the Arab claim to the whole of Palestine as long as he could acquire part of Palestine for himself. 'The internecine struggles of the Arabs,' reported Glubb, 'are more in the minds of Arab politicians than the struggle against the Jews. Azzam Pasha, the mufti and the Syrian government would sooner see the Jews get the whole of Palestine than that King Abdullah should benefit.'

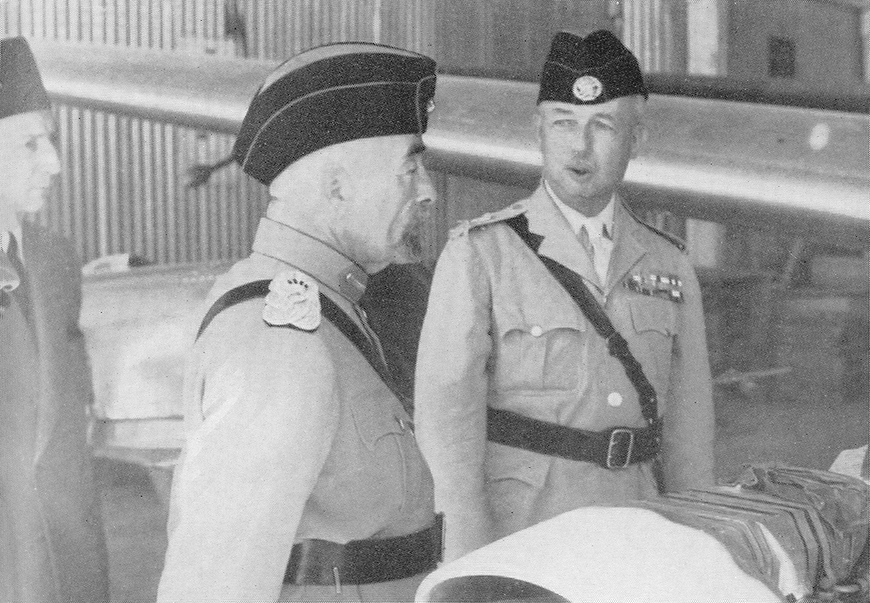
Glubb (right) with King Abdullah (left) the day before the King's assassination, 19 July 1951

Glubb remained in charge of the defence of the West Bank following the armistice in March 1949. In 1952, differences emerged between Glubb and the newly acceded King Hussein I, especially over defence arrangements, the promotion of Arab officers and the funding of the Legion. Arab nationalists believed that Glubb's first loyalty was to the United Kingdom and that he had attempted to pressure Hussein into joining the Baghdad Pact.

Hussein, wanting to distance himself from the British and to disprove the contention that Glubb was the actual ruler of Jordan, dismissed Glubb and several other British senior officers from the Arab Legion on 1 March 1956. Despite his decommission, which was forced upon him by public opinion, Glubb remained a close friend of the King.

== Later life ==
He spent the remainder of his life writing books and articles, mostly on the Middle East and on his experiences with the Arabs.

He served on the Board of Governors of Monkton Combe School from 1956 to 1966.

Glubb died in 1986 at his home in Mayfield, East Sussex. King Hussein gave the eulogy at the service for Glubb held in Westminster Abbey on 17 April 1986. A stained glass window in his local church, St Dunstan's Church, Mayfield, celebrates his life and legacy.

His widow died in 2006, whereupon his papers were deposited with the Middle East Centre Archive at St Antony's College, Oxford.

== Honours ==
Glubb was appointed OBE in 1924; CMG in 1946; and KCB in 1956.

Ribbon	Description	Notes
	Knight Commander of the Order of the Bath (KCB)	1956
	Companion of the Order of St Michael and St George (CMG)	1946
	Distinguished Service Order (DSO)	1941
	Order of the British Empire (OBE)	1924 Birthday Honours
	Military Cross (MC)	1918
	Order of Saint John (KStJ)	1954, Knight
	King's Police Medal (KPM)	1939, for distinguished service.
	1914–15 Star	
	British War Medal	
	Victory Medal	
	General Service Medal (1918)	
	1939–1945 Star	
	Defence Medal (United Kingdom)	
	War Medal 1939–1945	
	Supreme Order of the Renaissance	Order of El Nahda, 1st Class
	Order of Independence (Jordan)	Order of El Istiqlal, 1st Class
	Arab Legion Medal for World War II	
	Arab Legion Medal for 1948 Arab–Israeli War	
	Order of Al Rafidain	

== Autobiography ==
=== Reception ===
Glubb's autobiographical story A Soldier with the Arabs was reviewed in The Atlantic Monthly, April 1958; The National Review, May 1958; The Saturday Review, February 1958; The Reporter, April 1958; The New Yorker, October 1958; and Foreign Affairs, April 1958.

Writing in The Reporter, Ray Alan commented that the book was more than just an apologia; while it provided "no serious political analysis or social observation", it did offer interesting insights into the period, even if Glubb was out of touch with later trends in Middle Eastern politics. What Alan found more surprising was that Glubb also had hardly anything new to say about the 1948 Palestine war "in which he had star billing," instead lapsing into self-justifying propaganda. Alan ends his review with a long quotation from T. E. Lawrence, in which he reflects on what role a foreigner may play, and prays to God that "men will not, for love of the glamour of strangeness, go out to prostitute themselves and their talents in serving another race", but will let them "take what action or reaction they please from [his] silent example".

Writing in the Saturday Review, Carl Hermann Voss commented that Glubb served with and for the Arabs for 36 years, 17 of them for King Abdullah of Jordan. The portrait photograph is captioned "Glubb Pasha—'I ... failed hopelessly.'" Voss calls the book well written no matter how subjective.

== Legacy ==
In his 1993 poetry collection, Out of Danger, James Fenton mentions Glubb Pasha in "Here Come the Drum Majorettes!":

There's a Gleb on a steppe in a dacha.
There's a Glob on a dig on the slack side.
There's a Glubb in the sand (he's a pasha).

== Writings ==
The source for the following bibliography is Contemporary Authors Online, Gale, 2005. Reproduced in Biography Resource Center. Farmington Hills, Mich.: Thomson Gale. 2005, except *.

- (With Henry Field) The Yezidis, Sulubba, and Other Tribes of Iraq and Adjacent Regions, G. Banta, 1943.
- The Story of the Arab Legion., Hodder & Stoughton, 1948, Da Capo Press, 1976.
- A Soldier with the Arabs., Hodder & Stoughton, 1957.
- Britain and the Arabs: A Study of Fifty Years, 1908 to 1958, Hodder & Stoughton, 1959.
- War in the Desert: An R.A.F. Frontier Campaign, Hodder & Stoughton, 1960, Norton, 1961.
- The Great Arab Conquests, Hodder & Stoughton, 1963, Prentice-Hall, 1964. (vol. 1; 630-680)
- The Empire of the Arabs, Hodder & Stoughton, 1963, Prentice-Hall, 1964. (vol. 2; 680-860)
- The Course of Empire: The Arabs and Their Successors, Hodder & Stoughton, 1965, Prentice-Hall, 1966. (vol. 3; 860 onwards)
- The Lost Centuries: From the Muslim Empires to the Renaissance of Europe, Hodder & Stoughton, 1966, Prentice-Hall, 1967. (vol. 4; 1145–1453)
- Syria, Lebanon and Jordan, Walker & Co., 1967.
- The Middle East Crisis: A Personal Interpretation, Hodder & Stoughton, 1967.
- A Short History of the Arab Peoples, Stein & Day, 1969.
- The Life and Times of Muhammad, Stein & Day, 1970.
- Peace in the Holy Land: An Historical Analysis of the Palestine Problem., Hodder & Stoughton, 1971 (unavailable on line 8 Aug. 2021).
- Soldiers of Fortune: The Story of the Mamlukes, Stein & Day, 1973.
- The Way of Love: Lessons from a Long Life, Hodder & Stoughton, 1974.
- Haroon Al Rasheed and the Great Abbasids, Hodder & Stoughton, 1976.
- Into Battle: A Soldier's Diary of the Great War, Cassell, 1977.
- The Fate of Empires and Search for Survival (PDF)., Blackwood (Edinburgh), 1978.
- Arabian Adventures: Ten Years of Joyful Service, Cassell (London), 1978.
- The Changing Scenes of Life: An Autobiography, Quartet Books (London), 1983.

== See also ==
- Kfar Etzion massacre
- Faris Glubb
