= Arab Federation =

1958 short-lived confederation of Iraq and Jordan

Coordinates: 32.5000°N 39.0000°E

Hashemite Arab Federation الاتحاد العربي الهاشمي (Arabic) Al-Ittihad Al-'Arabī Al-Hashimi
- 1958
- Flag

- Capital and largest city: Baghdad
- Common languages: Arabic (Mesopotamian Arabic, Levantine Arabic)
- Religion: Majority: Islam (Sunni and Shi'a), minorities: Christianity and others
- Government: Confederal constitutional diarchy
  - King of Iraq: Faisal II
  - King of Jordan: Hussein
- Historical era: Arab Cold War
  - Established: 14 February 1958
  - Iraqi coup d'état: 14 July 1958
  - Disestablished: 2 August 1958

Area
  - Total: 533,314 km^{2} (205,914 sq mi)
- Currency: Iraqi Dinar
Preceded by	Succeeded by
Kingdom of Iraq; Kingdom of Jordan	Iraqi Republic; Kingdom of Jordan
- Today part of: Iraq; Jordan; West Bank

The Hashemite Arab Federation was a short-lived confederation that lasted from 14 February to 2 August 1958, between the Hashemite kingdoms of Iraq and Jordan. Although the name implies a federal structure, it was de facto a confederation.

The Federation was formed on 14 February 1958, when King Faisal II of Iraq and his cousin, King Hussein of Jordan, sought to unite their two Hashemite kingdoms as a response to the formation of the United Arab Republic between Egypt and Syria. The union lasted only six months. Faisal II was deposed by a military coup on 14 July, and the new Iraqi government officially dissolved the Federation on 2 August 1958.

== Background ==
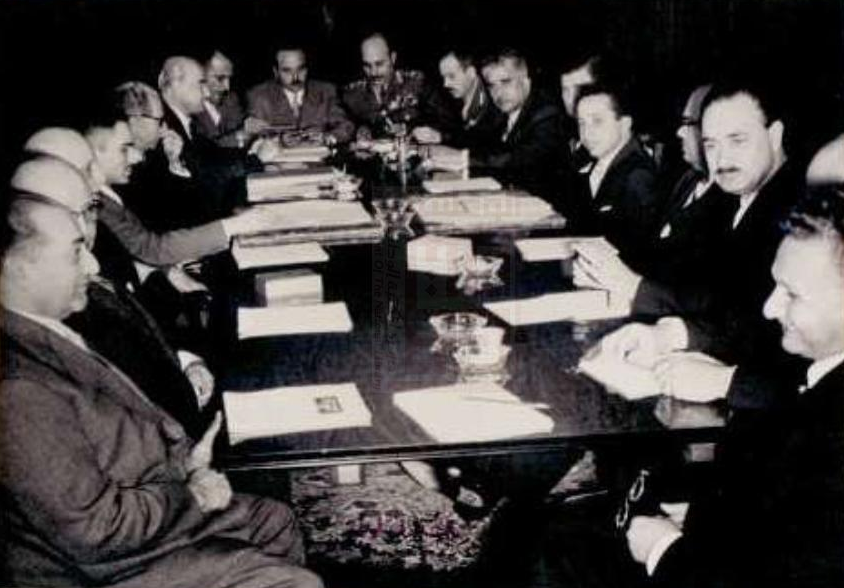
Talks between King Hussein and King Faisal on the Arab Federation, early 1958.

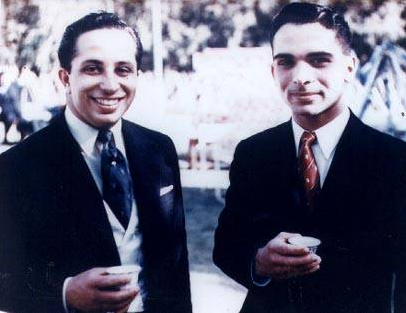
King Faisal with his cousin King Hussein.

Pan-Arabism and Arab nationalism were major movements in the Middle East after the dissolution of the Ottoman Empire in 1919–1925. Arab nationalism was particularly popular among intellectuals and the military. Pan-Arabists often advocated for an Arab Union that would combine all the Arabs in a single state, similar to romantic portrayals of the Ottoman Empire and the old caliphates. However, it was unclear who would lead any such proposed pan-Arab state, and major fissures grew between rivals for leadership. The Hashemite dynasty fashioned themselves as the true leaders of the Arab world, but were considered overly deferential to Western interests by other Arab nationalists, and had come to power with the assent and aid of the United Kingdom. Both Jordan and Iraq remained on largely friendly terms with the Western Bloc. In Iraq, pan-Arabism was treated with suspicion by Kurds, who were not Arabs, and by Shia Muslims, who viewed pan-Arabism as an excuse by the Arab Sunni minority to tie themselves to farther flung Sunni populations. The Hashemites' most prominent rival for leadership in the 1950s was Gamal Abdel Nasser, the president of Egypt, the most populous Arab country. Nasser, backed by the Free Officers Movement, had replaced the old monarchy of Egypt with a secular and Arab socialism-tinged republican government, and his brand of nationalism had little patience for monarchies. The House of Saud ruled Saudi Arabia with Wahhabi religious fervor, and was also on poor relations with the Hashemites. All of this ran up against the Cold War of the era, as governments turned to the Western Bloc, the Eastern Bloc, or both for support. The resulting struggle of how Arab nationalism intersected with it is sometimes called the Arab Cold War.

There were earlier efforts to unite Jordan and Iraq in the name of Arab unity, but they had come to nothing. In particular, from an Iraqi perspective, Jordan had little to offer economically or strategically and numerous liabilities. The liabilities included Jordanian King Abdullah's moderation on the Arab–Israeli conflict, the large number of Palestinians in Jordan, a lack of oil or other valuable resources in Jordan, and the unstable relationship between Abdullah and his nephew, the Iraqi regent 'Abd al-Ilah. Regardless of the issues, the two countries attempted unification in 1946 and 1947. The second time was in 1951 and 1952. King Abdullah was assassinated in 1951 and one of the succession options explored was merging Jordan into Iraq, giving a combined throne to Faisal II. Eventually, Abdullah was succeeded by his son Talal instead as King of Jordan, shortly followed by Hussein in 1952.

In 1955, Iraq entered the short-lived Baghdad Pact at the urging of the United Kingdom and the United States. The pact sought to block the Soviet Union from southward expansion and to prevent it from getting access to the petroleum resources of the Middle East. It was part of the containment policy. It aligned Iraq with other Western-friendly powers including Turkey, Pakistan, and Iran. While Prime Minister Nuri al-Said saw the treaty as a "guarantee" to the security of the Iraqi state, his government, and the Hashemite monarchy, Nasser openly and loudly criticized the treaty as a capitulation to imperialist traitors.

== History ==
=== Union ===
The third attempt at a formal alliance between Iraq and Jordan came in 1958. In early 1958, Nasser burnished his pan-Arabist credentials by convincing Syria and Egypt to unite as one country: the United Arab Republic (UAR). He portrayed it as the first step among many, openly advocating for other countries to join the UAR, a direct threat to both Hashemite regimes which bordered Syria. To counter Nasser's pan-Arabism, al-Said approached the Hashemite government of Jordan to discuss the formation of a similar union to appease Arab nationalists within Iraq. Officially formed on 14 February 1958, the Arab Union or Arab Federation united foreign policy and defense of each country but left the vast majority of other domestic programs under national jurisdiction. According to the 7th article of the Federation convention, the Arab revolt flag came to be the official flag of the Union. Iraq and Jordan were the first members, but they hoped for Kuwait to join.

Nuri al-Said resigned as Prime Minister of Iraq and became the Premier of the Arab Union. He neglected to see the growing opposition in the Sunni officer corps against the regime, however.

=== Iraqi military coup ===
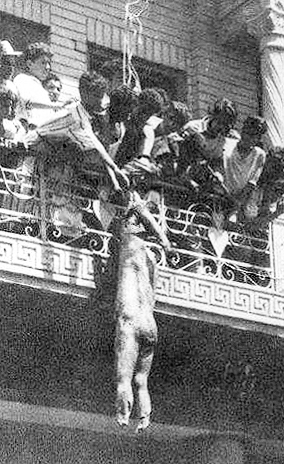
Mutilated corpse of King Faisal's cousin 'Abd al-Ilah hanging from a balcony.

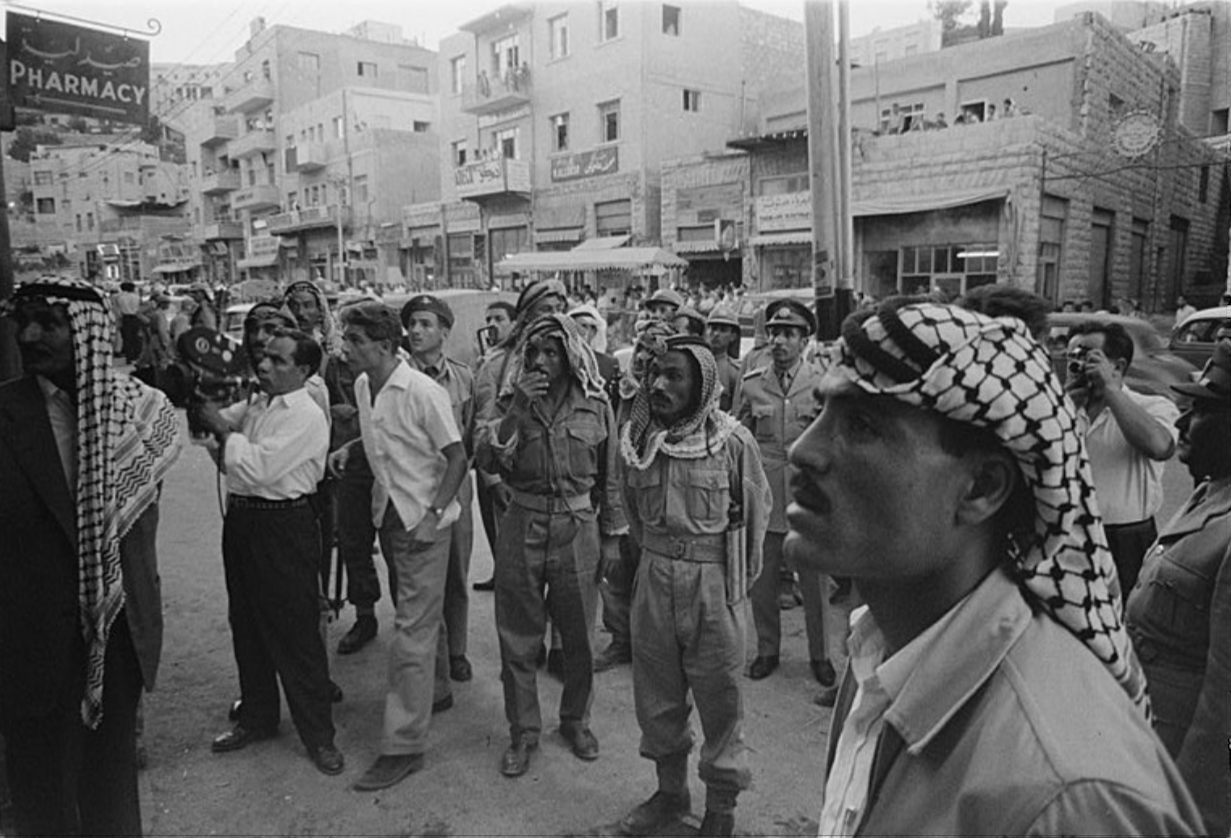
Crowd of men and soldiers in downtown Amman, Jordan, watching a news report about the deposition of the Hashemite monarchy in Iraq, marking the end of the Arab Federation, 14 July 1958.

Tension between the UAR and the Arab Federation worsened. During the summer of 1958, UAR troop movements to the Syrian border instigated the Arab Federation to mobilize troops to counter this move. Within Iraq, a group called the Free Officers plotted against the monarchy. They were inspired both by Iraq's turbulent history of coups and counter-coups in the past decades as well as Nasser's successful overthrow of the Egyptian monarchy in 1952, although they were not direct agents of Nasser. In July 1958, troops led by Abd al-Karim Qasim were transiting through Baghdad on their way to the Jordanian-Syrian border. Qasim took the opportunity, with his troops having a legitimate excuse to be in Baghdad, to overthrow the government there in the 14 July Revolution. With the fall and resulting deaths of al-Said, King Faisal II, and the rest of the Iraqi royal family, both the Hashemite regime fell and with it the short-lived Arab Federation.

The deposition of the Hashemites in Iraq had immediate ramifications on the Hashemites in Jordan. Not only were King Hussein's ruling cousins in Iraq executed, but so was the Jordanian Prime Minister Ibrahim Hashem who was visiting at the time. After the revolutionaries in Iraq declared a republic, King Hussein of Jordan requested immediate British and American aid. The British sent 4,000 soldiers to Jordan, while the US stationed troops in Beirut, Lebanon. The British forces remained until November 2, 1958, when the US pledged to "support the throne [of the Hashemites in Jordan]" and "provide the country with $40 to $50 million as an annual subsidy, replacing the British subsidy".

== Aftermath ==
The revolution and downfall of the Hashemite dynasty in Iraq would not be the end of relations between Iraq and Jordan. The Iraqi coup plotters who had ordered the execution of the Hashemites were themselves later overthrown and killed in the 1960s, perhaps easing the path to reconciliation. In 1975, Jordan turned away from their traditional economic relationship with Syria and instead looked to Iraq. Iraq offered Jordan a strong economy, oil money, a large market and strategic depth. With Iraq's financial aid, Jordan made some economic gains. By 1990 Iraq was "Jordan's largest market, it was repaying trade credit debts in oil, and it held out the hope of lucrative reconstruction contracts after the Iran–Iraq War."
