= Arab Legion =

British-led police and military unit in Jordan (1920–1956)

- الفيلق العربي
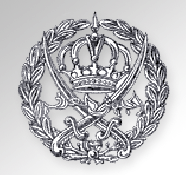
- Arab Legion insignia
- Active: 22 October 1920 – 25 March 1956
- Country: Jordan
- Allegiance: Emirate of Transjordan (1920–1946); Hashemite Kingdom of Jordan (1946–1956)
- Branch: Army
- Type: Infantry
- Size: 150 (1920); 12,000 (1949); 22,000 (1956)
- Garrison/HQ: Zarqa
- Patron: Monarch
- Anniversaries: 10 June 1917: Arab Revolt; 22 October 1920: Establishment of the Arab Legion; 25 May 1956: Dismissal of British officers
- Engagements: World War II (Mediterranean and Middle East theatre); Anglo-Iraqi War; Syrian Campaign; First Arab-Israeli War; Battle of Latrun; Battle of Jerusalem; Reprisal operations

Commanders
- Commander (1920–1939): Captain Frederick Gerard Peake
- Commander (1939–1956): Lieutenant General John Bagot Glubb
- Notable commanders: Colonel JW Hackett, Jr; Brigadier Norman Lash

The Arab Legion (Arabic: الفيلق العربي) was the police force and later the regular army of the Emirate of Transjordan, a British protectorate, and subsequently of the independent Hashemite Kingdom of Jordan. Established in 1920 as a British-commanded force, it remained under British leadership until 1 March 1956, when British senior officers were replaced with Jordanian ones and it was renamed the "Arab Army".

== Creation ==
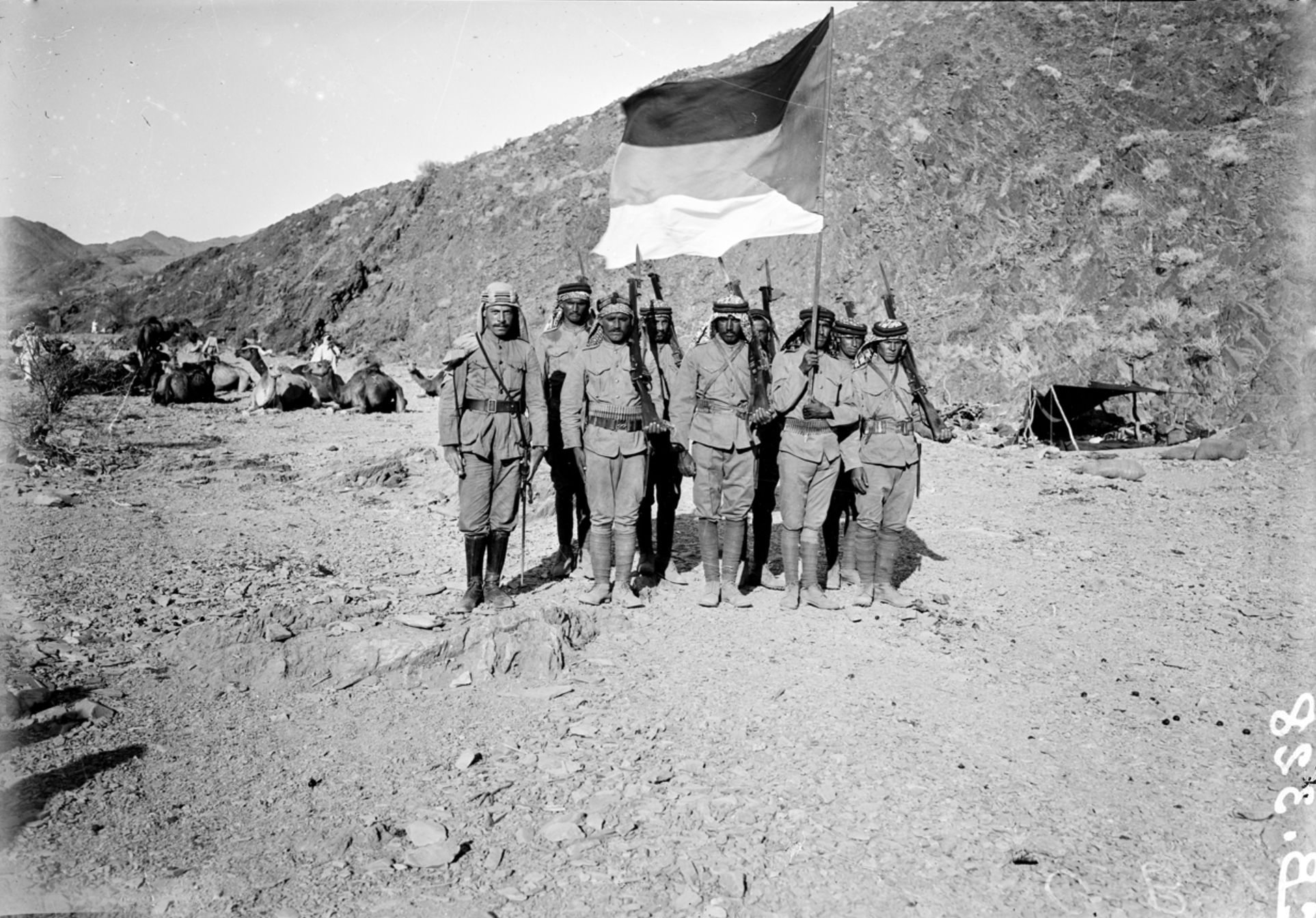
The Arab army during the Arab revolt of 1916 against the Ottoman Empire, which formed the nucleus of the Arab Legion

In October 1920, after taking over the Transjordan region from the Ottomans, the United Kingdom formed a unit of 150 men called the "Mobile Force", under the command of Captain Frederick Gerard Peake, to defend the territory against both internal and external threats. The Mobile Force was based in Zarqa. 80% of its men were drawn from the local Chechen community.

It was quickly expanded to 1,000 men, recruiting Arabs who had served in the Ottoman Army. On 22 October 1923, the police were merged with the Reserve Mobile Force, still under Peake, who was now an employee of the Emirate of Transjordan. The new force was named Al Jeish al Arabi ("the Arab Army") but was always known officially in English as the Arab Legion. The Arab Legion was financed by Britain and commanded by British officers. The Legion was formed as a police force to keep order among the tribes of Transjordan and to guard the important Jerusalem–Amman road.

On 1 April 1926, the Transjordan Frontier Force was formed from cadre drawn from the Arab Legion. It consisted of only 150 men, most of them stationed along Transjordan's roads. During this time the Arab Legion was reduced to 900 men and was stripped of its machine guns, artillery, and communications troops.

In 1939, John Bagot Glubb, better known as "Glubb Pasha", became the Legion's commander, with Major General Abdul Qadir Pasha Al Jundi as his deputy commander. Together they transformed it into the best-trained Arab army.

== World War II ==
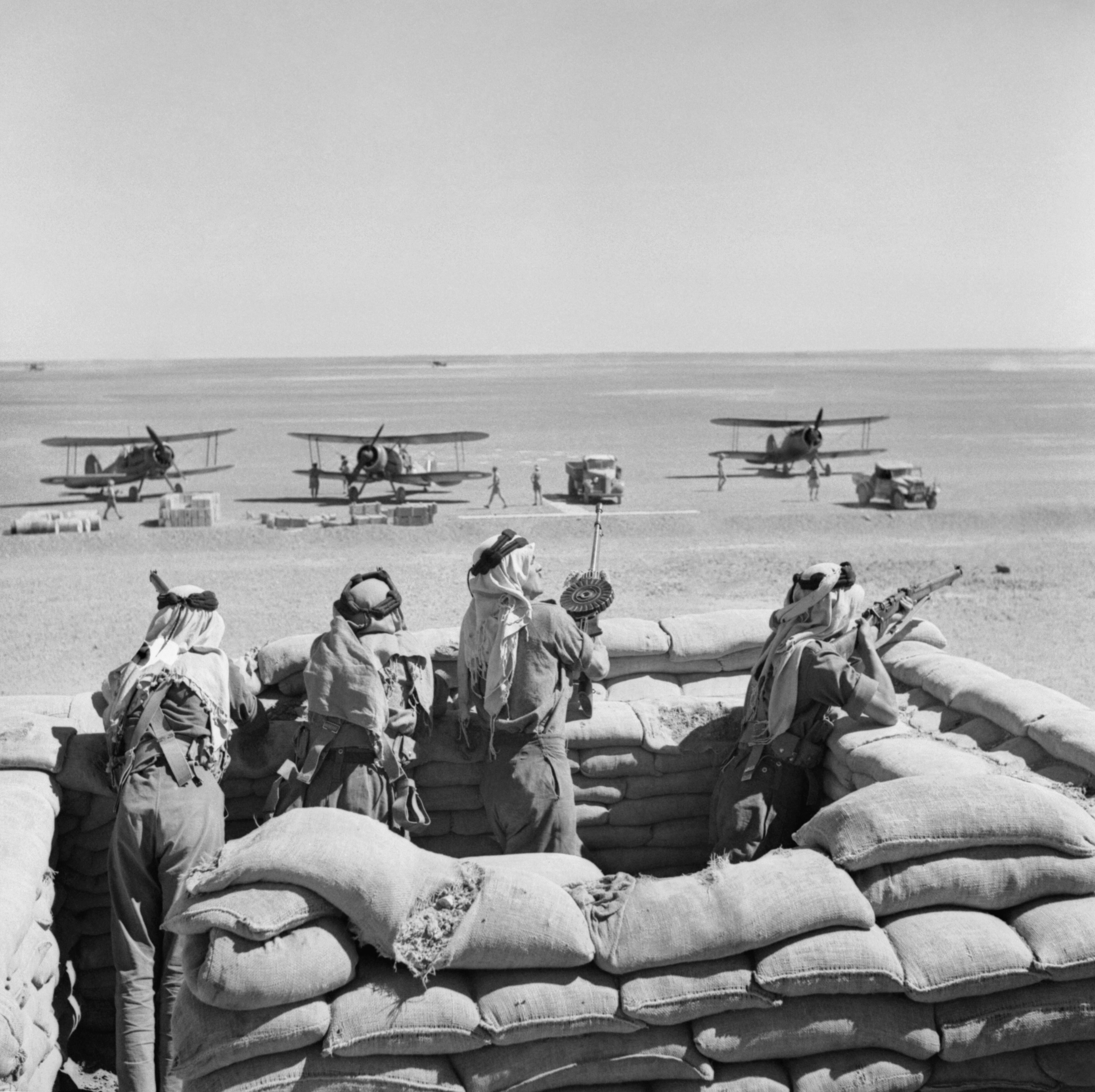
Arab Legion in Iraq during the Anglo-Iraqi War in 1941

During World War II, the Arab Legion took part in the British war effort against pro-Axis forces in the Mediterranean and Middle East Theatre. By then, the force had grown to 1,600 men.

The Legion, part of Iraqforce, contributed significantly in the Anglo-Iraqi War and in the Syria-Lebanon campaign, two decisive early victories for the Allies.

The top three officers representing the Legion who participated in the Victory March were Major General Abdul Qadir Pasha el Jundi, O.B.E., Colonel Bahjat Bey Tabbara, and Lieutenant Colonel Ahmed Sudqui Bey, M.B.E.

== 1948 Arab–Israeli War ==
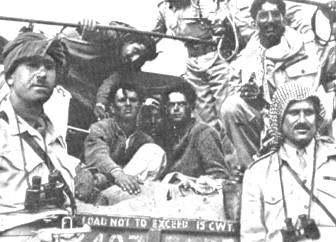
Arab Legion commander Abdullah el Tell (far right) with Captain Hikmat Mihyar (far left) pose with Jewish prisoners after the fall of Gush Etzion

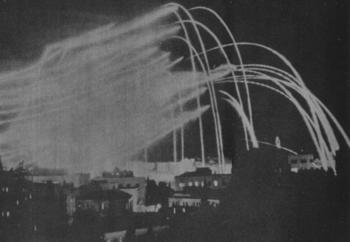
Arab Legion artillery shells illuminate Jerusalem in 1948

The Arab Legion actively participated in the 1948 Arab–Israeli war. With a total strength of just over 6,000, the Arab Legion's military contingent consisted of 4,500 men in four single battalion-sized regiments, each with their own armored car squadrons, and seven independent companies plus support troops. The regiments were organized into two brigades. 1st Brigade contained 1st and 3rd Regiments while 3rd brigade contained 2nd and 4th Regiments. There were also two artillery batteries with four 25-pounders each. On 9 February 1948 the Transjordan Frontier Force was disbanded with members being absorbed back into the Arab Legion. Although headed by Glubb, now a Lieutenant General, command in the field was by Brigadier Norman Lash.

The Legion was initially withdrawn from Palestine to Transjordanian territory, under instruction from the United Nations, prior to the end of the British Mandate. With the commencement of hostilities the Legion re-entered Palestine with 1st Brigade heading to Nablus and 2nd Brigade heading to Ramallah. The Arab Legion entered Palestine with other Arab forces on May 15, 1948, using the Allenby, now King Hussein, bridge as they were advancing to cover the approaches from Jenin, in the north to Alaffoula and from Al-Majame'a bridge on the Jordan River to Bissan Alaffoula.

There was considerable embarrassment from the UK government that British officers were employed in the Legion during the conflict and all of them, including a brigade commander, were ordered to return to Transjordan. This led to the bizarre spectacle of British officers leaving their units to return to Transjordan, only to sneak back across the border and rejoin the Arab Legion. Without exception all of the British officers returned to their units. John Platts-Mills, a Labour Member of Parliament, formally queried in Parliament why Glubb had not been prosecuted for serving in a foreign army in contravention of the Foreign Enlistment Act 1870.

Pennant used by commanders

Units of the Arab Legion were engaged in several battles with Zionist, and later Israeli forces, including the following:

- Attacking Ben Shemen convoy at Beit Nabala – 14 December 1947
- Battle of Neve Yaakov settlement – 18 April 1948
- Attacking Kibutz Gesher on 27–28 April 1948
- Occupation of the Tegart fort at Latrun on 17 May 1948, and later the Battles of Latrun from 20 May to 18 July 1948.
- Siege of Jerusalem from 17 May to 18 July 1948,
- Attacking and capturing (but later losing) Kibbutz Gezer on 10 June 1948,
- Tarqumiya on 24 October 1948

By the end of the war in 1949, the Arab Legion consisted of over 10,000 men manning a 100-mile front, which then expanded to a 400-mile front following the withdrawal of Iraqi forces.

== Further clashes with Israel ==
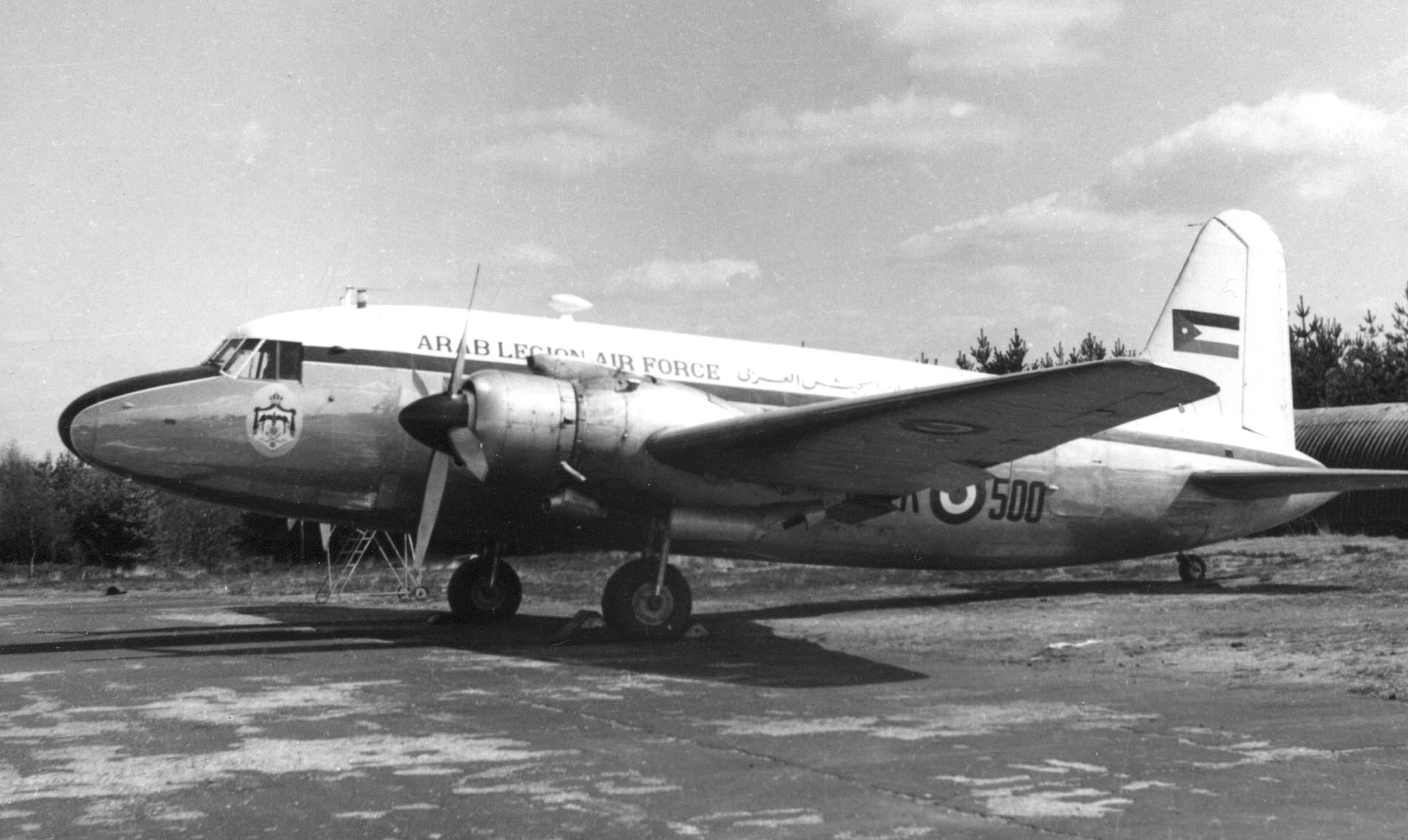
Vickers VC.1 Viking of the Arab Legion Air Force in 1955

On 11 September 1956, an Israeli force in what the IDF termed one of its retribution operations, Operation Jehonathan, raided Jordanian territory at Al-Rahwa, Hebron Sector, attacking the police station and clashing with a unit from the Legion's Desert Force. Over twenty soldiers and policemen were killed.

The Legion generally stayed out of the 1956 Suez Crisis.

== Jordanian army ==
On 1 March 1956, the Arab Legion was renamed as the Arab Army (now Jordanian Armed Forces) as part of the Arabization of its command, under which King Hussein of Jordan dismissed the Legion's British commander "Glubb Pasha" and other senior British officers. In Israel, the Hebrew term "Ligioner" (ליגיונר), i.e. "Legionary" was still informally used for Jordanian soldiers for many years afterwards, also at the time of the 1967 war and its aftermath.

== Commanders ==
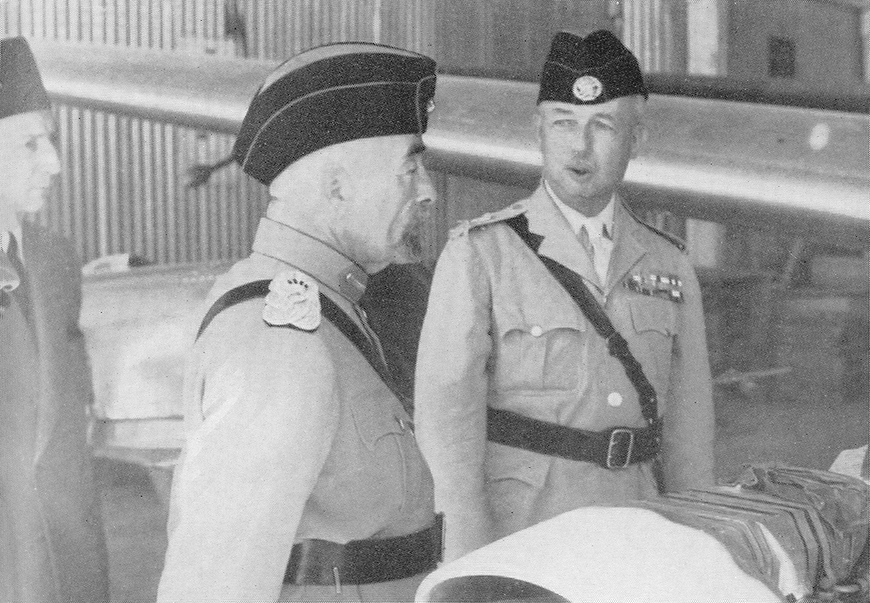
King Abdullah I with John Bagot Glubb "Glubb Pasha"

- Colonel Frederick Peake ("Peake Pasha") – 22 October 1923 – 21 March 1939
- Lieutenant Colonel Ernest Stafford ("Stafford Bey") 2nd IC—1924–1931.
- Lieutenant General John Glubb, KCB, CMG, DSO, OBE, MC ("Glubb Pasha") – 21 March 1939 – 1 March 1956
- Major General Abdul Qadir Pasha Al Jundi, O.B.E. ("Abdul Qadir Pasha") - 1–25 March 1956

Note: "Pasha" is a Turkish honorary title, one of various ranks, and is equivalent to the British title of "Lord". Bey is equivalent to a knighthood or "Sir".

== Bibliography ==
- Dupuy, Trevor N, Elusive Victory, The Arab-Israeli Wars, 1947–1974, Hero (1984)
- Farndale, Sir Martin, History of the Royal Regiment of Artillery, The Years of Defeat, 1939–41, Brassey's (1996)
- Glubb, John Bagot, The Arab Legion, Hodder & Stoughton, London (1948)
- Isseroff, A., Kfar Etzion Remembered: A History of Gush Etzion and the Massacre of Kfar Etzion, 2005.
- Levi, I., Jerusalem in the War of Independence ("Tisha Kabin" – Nine Measures – in Hebrew) Maarachot – IDF, Israel Ministry of Defence, 1986. ISBN 965-05-0287-4
- Pal, Dharm, Official History of the Indian Armed in the Second World War, 1939-45 - Campaign in Western Asia, Orient Longmans (1957)
- Roubicek, Marcel, Echo of the Bugle, extinct military and constabulary forces in Palestine and Trans-Jordan 1915, 1967, Franciscan (Jerusalem 1974)
- Shlaim, Avi (2007). Lion of Jordan: The Life of King Hussein in War and Peace, Allen Lane. ISBN 978-0-7139-9777-4
- Vatikiotis, P.J. (1967). Politics and the Military in Jordan: A Study of the Arab Legion, 1921-1957, New York, Praeger Publishers.
- Young, Peter (1972). The Arab Legion, Osprey Publishing. ISBN 0-85045-084-5 and ISBN 978-0-85045-084-2
- Jordan – A Country Study, U.S. Library of Congress
