= Mohammad Malkawi =

Jordanian general and politician

Mohammad al-Malkawi
- محمد يوسف الملكاوي
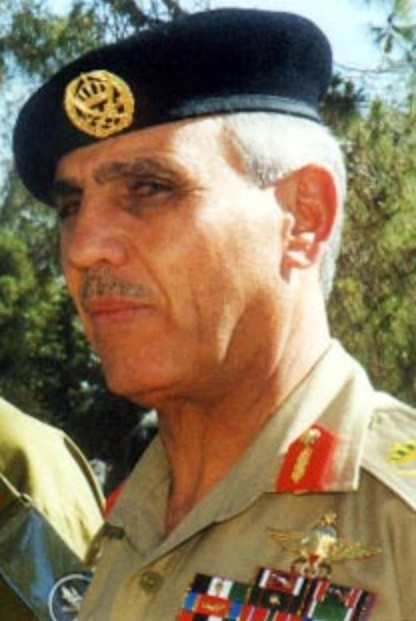
- Mohammad Al-Malkawi on 13 July 2000
- Born: 10 November 1943 (age 82); Malka, Jordan
- Citizenship: Jordan
- Education: Mutah University
- Occupations: Military officer; politician
- Years active: 1961–2002
- Employers: Jordanian Armed Forces; Royal Hashemite Court; The Senate of Jordan
- Title: Chairman of the Joint Chiefs of Staff of the Jordanian Armed Forces
- Term: 18 July 1999 – 5 March 2002
- Predecessor: Abdel Hafez Ka'abneh
- Successor: Khaled Sarayra
- Political party: Independent
- Children: 5
- Awards: Order of the Star of Jordan Order of Independence Legion of Merit

General officer Mohammad Youssef Al-Malkawi (Arabic: محمد يوسف الملكاوي, Levantine Arabic pronunciation: [moˈħæmːæd ˈjuːsef el mælˈkæːwi]; born 10 November 1943) is a Jordanian military officer and politician. He served as the King's chancellor and as chairman of the Joint Chiefs of Staff of the Jordanian Armed Forces from 18 July 1999 to 5 March 2002. Following King Abdullah's accession after the death of King Hussein, al-Malkawi assumed command of the Jordanian Army. He has held several senior posts in the armed forces and government and is a member of the Jordanian Senate.

Al-Malkawi is from Mansoura in the Malka area of Irbid Governorate in northern Jordan. He joined the Jordanian Armed Forces (Arab Army) in 1963. Over his career he participated in the Six-Day War, the Battle of Karameh in 1968, Yom Kippur War, and the Dhofar War in Oman.

== Early life ==
Mohammad al-Malkawi was born on 10 November 1943 in Malka, Jordan. He received his early education at the Mansoura town school. On 23 October 1963 he enlisted in the Jordanian Armed Forces (Arab Army) and entered the Royal Military College. He graduated in November 1965 with the rank of lieutenant and served as a company commander in the Special Operations Forces.

== Personal life ==
Al-Malkawi is married and has five children. His sons are named Raafat and Rabat, while he also has three daughters: Heba, Ruba, and Raghad.

== Military and political life ==
Al-Malkawi earned a bachelor's degree in military science and a master's degree in military and administrative sciences from Mu'tah University in 1988. His service record includes the Six-Day War (1967) and the Battle of Karameh (1968). He commanded a company during the Yom Kippur War on the Syrian front and served in Oman during the Dhofar conflict as assistant to the Jordanian battalion commander. After returning to Jordan in late 1975, he held a series of command and staff posts.

=== Leadership positions ===
Throughout his career in the Jordanian Armed Forces, al-Malkawi held senior posts. He was Chief of Staff of the Royal Jordanian Army, commander of the Special Forces, and commander of the Southern Military Region, where he oversaw operations, logistics, and regional security. He advanced through the ranks in a series of command and staff roles.

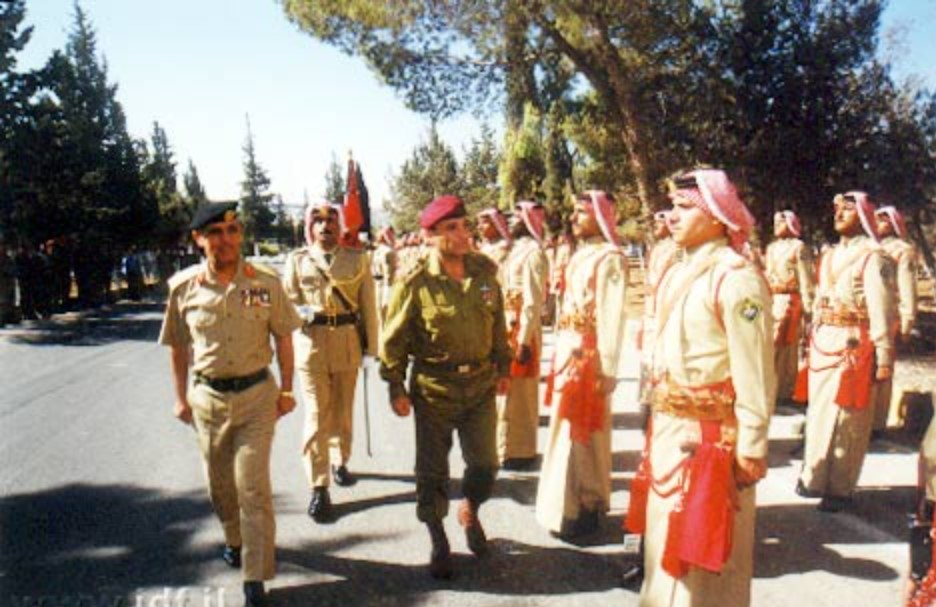
Malkawi, positioned at the far left, welcoming an external delegation in his role as the army commander.

As inspector general, he supervised audits of operational readiness and implemented organizational reforms. As chief of staff of the Royal Land Forces, he directed modernization and training programs and oversaw ground operations. He also headed the National Mine Clearance Authority. After King Abdullah II's accession, he was appointed chairman of the Joint Chiefs of Staff (Commander of the Army). He became the first Special Operations personnel to hold this role. He retired on March 5, 2002, and was succeeded by Khaled Sarayra.

By royal decree dated 21 July 2004, al-Malkawi was appointed adviser to the Royal Hashemite Court, and the decree conferred the honorific "His Excellency". He later served multiple terms in the Jordanian Senate and sat on the Board of Directors of the International Affairs Association. He has also served on boards of trustees at Jordan University of Science and Technology, Amman Arab University, and Jadara University.

== Honors and awards ==
His services were recognized through several awards from Jordan and foreign countries. The most prominent of these awards are:

=== Local honours ===
- Jordan: War Wounded Medal for the 1967 war.
- Jordan: Order of the Star, second class.
- Jordan: Order of Military Merit, First Class.
- Jordan: Order of Independence, First Class.
- Jordan: Supreme Order of the Renaissance.

=== Foreign honours ===
- United States: American Legion of Merit, Commander rank.
- Japan: Order of the Sacred Treasure bestowed by the Emperor of Japan.
- Oman: General Service Medal.
