= Chairman of the Joint Chiefs of Staff (Jordan) =

Head of the armed forces of Jordan

Chairman of the Joint Chiefs of Staff of the Jordanian Armed Forces
- رئيس هيئة الأركان المشتركة للقوات المسلحة الأردنية
- Incumbent; Major General Majdi Harasis, RJA since 2 September 2026
- Jordanian Armed Forces
- Member of: Joint Chiefs of Staff
- Reports to: King of Jordan
- Seat: Amman, Jordan
- Appointer: King of Jordan
- Precursor: Commander of the Arab Legion
- Formation: 1 March 1956
- First holder: Major General Radi Annab

The Chairman of the Joint Chiefs of Staff (Arabic: رئيس هيئة الأركان المشتركة), previously the Chief of Staff, is the office for the head of the Jordanian Armed Forces held by a lieutenant general or higher ranking officer.

Major general Majdi Harasis is the current Chairman, who was appointed to this position on 2 September 2026, after having headed Jordan's military intelligence from 2022 to 2026.

The position was established on 1 March 1956, when the late King Hussein dismissed senior British officers who had commanded the country's Arab Legion since its establishment in 1921. The Arab Legion was subsequently renamed the Jordanian Armed Forces—Arab Army.

== List of chairmen (1920–present) ==
=== Arab Legion (1920–1956) ===
No.	Portrait	Commander of the Army	Took office	Left office	Time in office	Defence branch
1	Frederick Peake	Lieutenant General; Frederick Peake (1886–1970)	22 October 1920	3 May 1939	18 years, 193 days	Arab Legion
2	John Glubb	Lieutenant General; John Glubb (1897–1986)	25 June 1939	1 March 1956	16 years, 303 days	Arab Legion

=== Jordanian Armed Forces – Arab Army (1956–present) ===
No.	Portrait	Chairman of the Joint Chiefs of Staff	Took office	Left office	Time in office	Defence branch
3	Radi Annab	Major General; Radi Annab (1898–1980)	1 March 1956	24 May 1956	53 days	Royal Jordanian Army
4	Ali Abu Nuwar	Major General; Ali Abu Nuwar (1925–1991)	24 May 1956	14 April 1957	325 days	Royal Jordanian Army
5	Ali Hayari	Major General; Ali Hayari (1923–2002)	17 April 1957	20 April 1957	3 days	Royal Jordanian Army
6	Habis Majali	Field Marshal; Habis Majali (1914–2001)	20 April 1957	8 October 1967	10 years, 167 days	Royal Jordanian Army
7	Amer Khammash	Lieutenant General; Amer Khammash (1924–2010)	9 October 1967	27 October 1968	1 year, 18 days	Royal Jordanian Army
8	Mashour Haditha	Lieutenant General; Mashour Haditha (1928–2001)	27 October 1968	30 June 1969	246 days	Royal Jordanian Army
9	Sharif Nasser	Major General; Sharif Nasser (1902–1982)	30 June 1969	11 June 1970	1 year, 346 days	Royal Jordanian Army
(6)	Habis Majali	Field Marshal; Habis Majali (1914–2001)	11 June 1970	15 September 1970	96 days	Royal Jordanian Army
(8)	Mashour Haditha	Lieutenant General; Mashour Haditha (1928–2001)	16 September 1970	11 January 1976	5 years, 117 days	Royal Jordanian Army
10	Zaid ibn Shaker	Field Marshal; Zaid ibn Shaker (1934–2002)	11 January 1976	19 December 1988	12 years, 343 days	Royal Jordanian Army
11	Fat'hi Abu Taleb	Field Marshal; Fat'hi Abu Taleb (1933–2016)	19 December 1988	5 April 1993	4 years, 107 days	Royal Jordanian Army
12	Abdel Hafez Ka'abneh	Field Marshal; Abdel Hafez Ka'abneh (1937–2016)	5 April 1993	18 July 1999	6 years, 104 days	Royal Jordanian Army
13	Mohammad Malkawi	General; Mohammad Malkawi (born 1943)	18 July 1999	5 March 2002	2 years, 230 days	Royal Jordanian Army
14	Khaled Sarayra	General; Khaled Sarayra (born 1944)	5 March 2002	23 February 2010	7 years, 355 days	Royal Jordanian Army
15	Mashal Zaben	General; Mashal Zaben (born 1953)	23 February 2010	2 October 2016	6 years, 222 days	Royal Jordanian Army
16	Mahmoud Freihat	Lieutenant General; Mahmoud Freihat (born 1960)	2 October 2016	24 July 2019	2 years, 295 days	Royal Jordanian Army
17	Yousef Huneiti	Lieutenant General; Yousef Huneiti (born 1959)	24 July 2019	2 September 2026	7 years, 40 days	Royal Jordanian Air Force
18	Majdi Harasis	Major General; Majdi Harasis (born 1971)	2 September 2026	Incumbent	51 days	Royal Jordanian Army

== See also ==
- Arabization of the Jordanian Army command

== Bibliography ==
- "1956: King of Jordan sacks British general". BBC News. British Broadcasting Corporation. 2 March 1956.
- "Jordan marks 61st anniversary of army Arabisation". The Jordan Times. 28 February 2017.
