= Amer Khammash =

Jordanian general and politician (1924–2010)

His Excellency Lieutenant General Pasha Amer "Mohammad Baseem" Rafiq Khammash
- عامر "محمد بسيم" رفيق الخمّاش
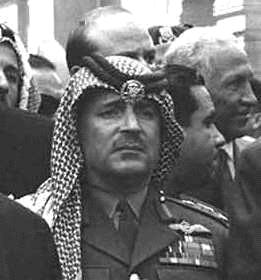

Chairman of the Joint Chiefs of Staff of the Jordanian Armed Forces
- In office 9 October 1967 – 27 October 1968
- Monarch: Hussein I
- Prime Minister: Bahjat Talhouni
- Preceded by: Habis Al-Majali
- Succeeded by: Mashour Haditha Al-Jazy

Minister of Transport
- In office 13 August 1969 – 26 August 1969

Minister of Defence
- In office 30 June 1969 – 26 August 1969

Personal details
- Born: 14 November 1924 Al-Salt, Transjordan
- Died: 13 February 2010 (aged 85) Amman, Jordan
- Resting place: Jordan
- Party: Independent

Military service
- Allegiance: Jordan
- Branch/service: Royal Jordanian Army
- Years of service: 1941-1969
- Rank: Lieutenant general
- Battles/wars: Palestine War (1947-49) Six-Day War (1967) War of Attrition (1967–70) Battle of Karameh (1968)

Amer Khammash,OI OSJ SOR KStJ (14 November 1924, Al-Salt, Transjordan - 13 February 2010) was a Jordanian lieutenant general, political and personal adviser to King Hussein of Jordan, as well as being His Majesty's special representative, Chief of The Royal Hashemite Court twice and a five-term member of the Senate of Jordan.

== Biography ==
He was the son of a lawyer and judge "Mohammad Baseem" Khammash, who was well known for being the country's first court judge. Amongst his achievements, General Khammash was the first recognized Jordanian pilot and received his pilot training in RAF Middle Wallop in the United Kingdom in 1949, and received his wings in 1950 from King Abdullah I, the founder of Jordan. He returned to Jordan and later attended the United States Army Command and General Staff College in Fort Leavenworth, Kansas, in 1958, where his portrait hangs in the Hall of Fame in the Staff College.

After graduating from the college, he returned to Jordan and was promoted to General Chief of Staff in 1967 after the Six-Day War. Following this he held various high ranking positions such as: Minister of Defence, personal representative of his Majesty King Hussein, Minister of the Royal Hashemite Court, and personal and political advisor to His Majesty King Hussein until he was appointed to the Upper House of the Parliament of Jordan in 1988. He held this position until the year 2000.

General Khammash died after a short illness in Amman, Jordan, on 13 February 2010 at the age of 85. He was given a full military funeral in Jordan, which was televised throughout the Middle East, and was survived by his two sons, Mazen and Maher, daughter Suzi, nine grandchildren, and six great-grandchildren.

== Awards and decorations ==
Amongst his many achievements and medals that he received, the most notable were the Légion d'honneur, the highest-ranking French decoration, which was awarded to him by President Charles De Gaulle of France. Queen Elizabeth II also presented him with an Associate Knighthood of the Venerable Order of St John. He was also awarded the highest honor medals from King Hussein bin Talal for duties to his country: Grand Cordon (1st class) of the Order of Independence, Grand Cordon (1st class) of the Order of the Star of Jordan and Grand Cordon with Brilliants of the Supreme Order of the Renaissance. He also received the Vatican Medal from Pope John Paul II and many other Medals from various Arab and International Leaders. During his career, General Khammash met numerous Heads of State including every U.S. president starting with Dwight D. Eisenhower in 1958 and culminating with President Bill Clinton in 1992.

== Honours ==
- Jordan:
  - Grand Cordon with Brilliants of the Supreme Order of the Renaissance
  - Grand Cordon of the Order of the Star of Jordan
  - Grand Cordon of the Order of Independence
  - Grand Cordon of the Order of Military Merit
  - Recipient of the Long Service Medal
  - Recipient of the Medal for Participation in the Battle of Karameh
  - Recipient of the Silver Jubilee of Hussein bin Talal
  - Recipient of the Medal for Joint Military Operations 1942 (Iraq and Syria Campaign Medal)
  - Recipient of the Medal for the 1939-1945 War (World War II Campaign Medal)
  - Recipient of the Medal for Military Operations in Palestine 1948
- Germany:
  - Grand Cross of the Order of Merit of the Federal Republic of Germany
- Spain:
  - Knight Grand Cross of the Order of Isabella the Catholic (gcYC)
- United Kingdom:
  - Associate Knight of Grace of the Most Venerable Order of the Hospital of St. John of Jerusalem (KStJ)
  - Recipient of the 1939-1945 Star
  - Recipient of the Defence Medal
  - Recipient of the War Medal 1939-1945
  - Recipient of the General Service Medal (1918)
- United States:
  - Commander of the Legion of Merit
