= Habis Majali =

Jordanian general (1914–2001)

- حابس المجالي
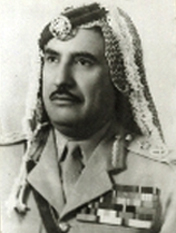
- Habis Majali in 1975
- Born: 1914; Ma'an, Ottoman Empire
- Died: April 22, 2001 (aged 86–87); Al Karak, Jordan
- Relatives: Hazza' Majali (cousin)
- Military career
- Allegiance: Jordan
- Service years: 1932–1981
- Rank: Field Marshal
- Commands: Arab Legion; Jordanian Armed Forces
- Conflicts: Second World War; First Arab–Israeli War; Battle of Latrun; Battles for Jerusalem; Six Day War; Black September; Yom Kippur War

Habis Majali (Arabic: حابس المجالي; 1914 – April 22, 2001) was a Jordanian field marshal, who served as Chief of Staff of the Jordanian Armed Forces from 1958 to 1975, as minister of defense from 1967 to 1968. He became a politician in his later life and served as a member of the Jordanian Senate for 30 years from 1967 to 1997.

He commanded Jordan's forces against Israel during the 1948 Arab–Israeli War (also known as the First Arab-Israeli War), the Six Day War in 1967 and the Yom Kippur War in 1973; and against the Palestine Liberation Organization and Syria during Black September in 1970. During the last 20 years of his life, he retired from the army and served as senator in the Jordanian Parliament's upper chamber.

Majali is considered to be Jordan's greatest military officers; he was the only Arab general to inflict military victories against Israelis, Palestinians and Syrians alike. King Hussein's biographer, James Lunt, dubbed Majali the grand seigneur of Karak, and the beau sabreur of the army. Majali is one of few Jordanians, along with the Kings of Jordan, to hold the Field Marshal rank–the highest rank in the Jordanian army.

== Early life and background ==
Habis Majali was born in 1914 in Ma'an, Jordan, into the influential Majali tribe, known for its political and military leadership in southern Jordan. The Majalis were a prominent Bedouin family in the Karak region, historically associated with Jordanian tribal leadership. From a young age, Habis displayed qualities of leadership that would later become the hallmark of his military career. He joined the Arab Legion in 1932, which was then under British command. His Bedouin roots and early experiences in Jordan’s tribal culture profoundly influenced his later military leadership.

== Military career ==
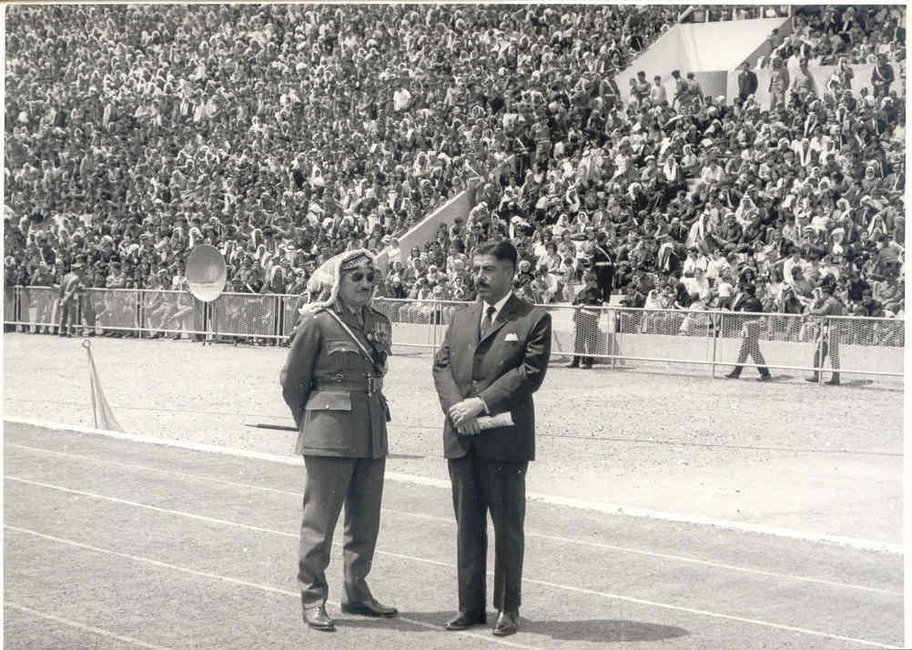
Habis Majali seen with Prime Minister Wasfi Tal during a military parade.

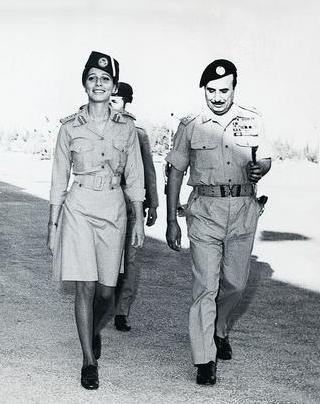
Habis Majali walking alongside Queen Alia, 1960s.

=== Early career and the Arab Legion ===
Habis Majali’s military career began with his service in the Arab Legion, where he quickly impressed Glubb Pasha, the British officer who led the Legion. Majali was known for blending modern military techniques with Bedouin traditions of bravery. King Hussein's biographer, James Lunt, dubbed Majali the grand seigneur of Karak and beau sabreur of the army. Habis Pasha was the only Arab commander to win military victories against Israelis, Palestinians and Syrians alike. His "baptism of fire", according to The Guardian obituary, came during the 1948 Arab–Israeli War, when he successfully defended the town of Latrun at the crucial Battle of Latrun near Jerusalem against Israeli forces, Israeli forces was one of the few Arab victories in the war, earning him widespread recognition. He also managed to secure the West Bank under Glubb Pasha.

=== Commanding Jordan’s Forces ===
Majali’s command extended into the 1950s, a period marked by political upheaval in Jordan. He served as Commander of the Royal Guard in 1951 when King Abdullah I was assassinated at Al-Aqsa Mosque. Abdullah insisted on speaking to the crowds on his way to the mosque, but Majali thought it was too dangerous and ordered soldiers to surround the King–angering him. The King moved ahead of his guards, and was shot dead by a Palestinian. This event highlights his protective instincts toward the monarchy. Majali claimed that he had caught Ariel Sharon in the battle, who was then a young Lieutenant. Sharon, who would later become Israeli prime minister, denied the claim. However, Habis boasted: "Sharon is like a grizzly bear, I captured him for 9 days, I healed his wounds and released him due to his insignificance." Few fellow high-ranking Jordanian officers testified in favor of his account. Throughout the decade, Majali remained a critical figure, tasked by King Hussein to root out Nasserite insurgents and maintain internal stability. Majali was tasked in 1960 with restoring order after Syrian agents had murdered his cousin Prime Minister Hazza' Majali.

=== Six-Day War and Black September ===
In 1967, Majali led Jordanian forces during the Six-Day War against Israel. The war resulted in the loss of the West Bank, but Majali’s leadership was seen as steadfast, although he resigned shortly after the defeat. He briefly served as minister of defense before returning to military leadership during Black September in 1970, where he oversaw the expulsion of Palestinian fedayeen forces from Jordan. His efforts helped preserve the Hashemite monarchy during this volatile period.

Jordan lost the West Bank to Israel during the 1967 Six Day War. Majali was forced during the war to relinquish Jordan's army command to Egypt. He then resigned, but served as defense minister until 1968.

=== Yom Kippur War and Retirement ===
Though Jordan did not engage directly on the frontlines during the Yom Kippur War of 1973, Majali’s leadership was instrumental in maintaining border security. Military historians, such as Trevor N. Dupuy, praised the Jordanian Army's tactical proficiency during the conflict, noting that it outperformed other Arab forces, specifically those of Syria and Iraq. Majali retired from active military service in 1975 after 17 years as Chairman of the Joint Chiefs of Staff, leaving a legacy of military professionalism and dedication.

== Political career ==
=== Senator and advisor ===
After retiring from the military, Majali transitioned into a political role, serving as a senator in Jordan's upper chamber of Parliament for 30 years. During this time, he remained a close advisor to both King Hussein and later King Abdullah II, contributing to the nation's military and political strategies. Majali’s experience and wisdom continued to shape Jordan’s defense policies long after his active service ended.

== Personal life and legacy ==
Majali was deeply rooted in Jordan’s Bedouin culture, which informed his leadership style and earned him respect both as a military leader and as a defender of the Hashemite monarchy. His family played significant roles in Jordanian politics, including his cousin Hazza' Majali, who served as prime minister before his assassination in 1960. Known as the "Grand Seigneur of Karak," Majali's contributions to Jordanian military and political life are remembered with reverence. His military legacy is highlighted by his tactical victories and his defense of Jordan's territorial integrity.

== Honour ==
=== Honors and recognitions ===
Majali was one of the few Jordanians to achieve the rank of field marshal, the highest military rank in Jordan. He was honored with several awards throughout his career, including the titles of:

- Malaysia : Honorary Commander of the Order of the Defender of the Realm (1965)

His enduring legacy is celebrated both within Jordan and internationally as a symbol of national strength and leadership.
