= Radi Annab =

Jordanian military officer

Major general Radi Hassan Annab
- راضي حسن عنّاب
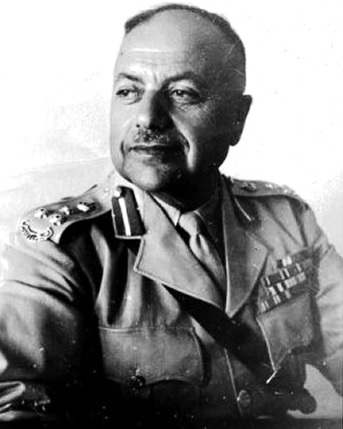
- Born: Radi Hassan Annab; 23 July 1897; Nablus, Beirut Vilayet, Ottoman Empire
- Died: 12 September 1993 (aged 96); Amman, Jordan
- Military career
- Other work: Chief of Police, Public Security Official
- Military career
- Allegiance: Ottoman Empire; Kingdom of Hejaz; Jordan
- Branch: Royal Jordanian Army
- Service years: 1923–1956 (Arab Legion); 1916–1918 (Sharifian Army)
- Rank: Major General
- Unit: Arab Legion
- Conflicts: First World War; Middle Eastern theatre of World War I; Arab Revolt; 1948 Arab-Israeli War
- Awards: Order of the Renaissance; Medal of Independence

Radi Hassan Annab (Arabic: راضي حسن عنّاب, romanized: Rāḍī Ḥassan ʿAnnāb; 23 July 1897 – 12 September 1993) was a Jordanian military officer and the first Arab commander of the Arab Legion, which later became the Jordanian Armed Forces. He played a pivotal role in the Arabization of Jordan's military leadership, leading the transition from British to Arab command. His appointment marked a historic moment in Jordan's military history, symbolizing the Arabization of the Jordanian Army under King Hussein.

== Early life and background ==
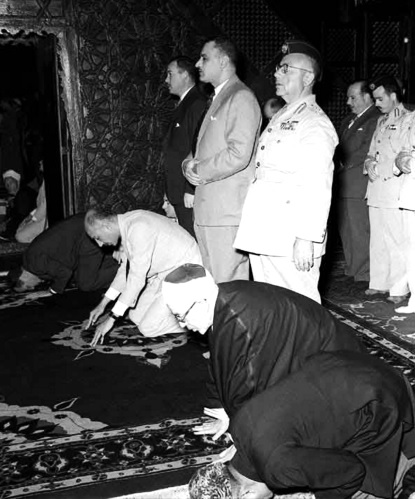
Annab (standing front row in military uniform) praying alongside Egyptian president Gamal Abdel Nasser during Ramadan, 1956

Radi Annab was born on 23 July 1897 in Nablus, then part of the Ottoman Empire. His father was Hajj Hassan Annab served as an officer in the Ottoman Army. instilling in Radi a deep sense of military discipline and professionalism from a young age. Annab initially followed in his father's footsteps, joining the Ottoman military during World War I. However, in 1916, he defected to join the Arab Revolt led by Sharif Hussein, fighting alongside Arab forces against the Ottomans in their quest for independence This experience laid the foundation for Annab’s long military career.

== Military career ==
In 1923, Annab was among the Arab officers who formed the core of the British-led Arab Legion of the Emirate of Transjordan, which was ostensibly ruled by Sharif Hussein's son, Emir Abdullah I. Annab was the chief of police for the Balqa District in 1930, as well as the Arab Legion's chief of public security. In 1937, he was assigned chief of police of Karak District, before being reassigned to Balqa the following year. In 1941, Annab was reassigned chief of public security and then posted as the chief of police in Amman and Ajloun in 1943 and 1944, respectively.

As the Jerusalem District's police chief, Annab was present with King Abdullah I during the latter's assassination at the al-Aqsa Mosque in Jerusalem by a Palestinian shooter opposed to the king's policies. In the ensuing firefight with the shooter, who was shot dead, Annab was wounded. On 29 June 1953, Annab met with Israeli general Moshe Dayan where they discussed ways to put an end to attempts by Palestinian refugees to infiltrate into the Israeli side of the Green Line, a cause of consternation for Israel.

== Arabization of the Jordanian Armed Forces ==
On 1 March 1956, King Hussein embarked on the Arabization of Jordan's military leadership, dismissing Glubb Pasha, the British commander of the Arab Legion. In his place, Radi Annab was appointed the first Arab commander of the Arab Legion, a decision aimed at asserting Jordan’s sovereignty and reducing British influence over the military. Prior to his appointment, Annab had only held police posts. Annab’s leadership was brief retiring from his position only two months later on 24 May 1956, being succeeded by Major Colonel Ali Abu Nuwar.

== Later life and death ==
Radi Annab retired from active military service shortly after his historic appointment but remained a highly respected figure in Jordan’s military history. He was decorated with the Medal of Independence and the Order of the Renaissance for his contributions to the nation.

Annab died on 12 September 1993 in Amman, Jordan, at the age of 96. Leaving behind a legacy as one of the pioneers of Jordanian military leadership.

== Awards ==
Following his retirement, Radi Annab lived in Amman and remained a respected figure in Jordan's military and political circles. His contributions to the Arab Revolt, the Arab Legion, and the Jordanian Army were recognized with multiple prestigious awards, including:

- (Jordan) Order of Independence
- (Jordan) Supreme Order of the Renaissance

== Bibliography ==
- Yitzhak, Ronen (2012). Abdullah Al-Tall, Arab Legion Officer: Arab Nationalism and Opposition to the Hashemite Regime. Sussex Academic Press. ISBN 978-1-84519-408-6.
