= Mashal Zaben =

Jordanian military commander and royal adviser (born 1953)

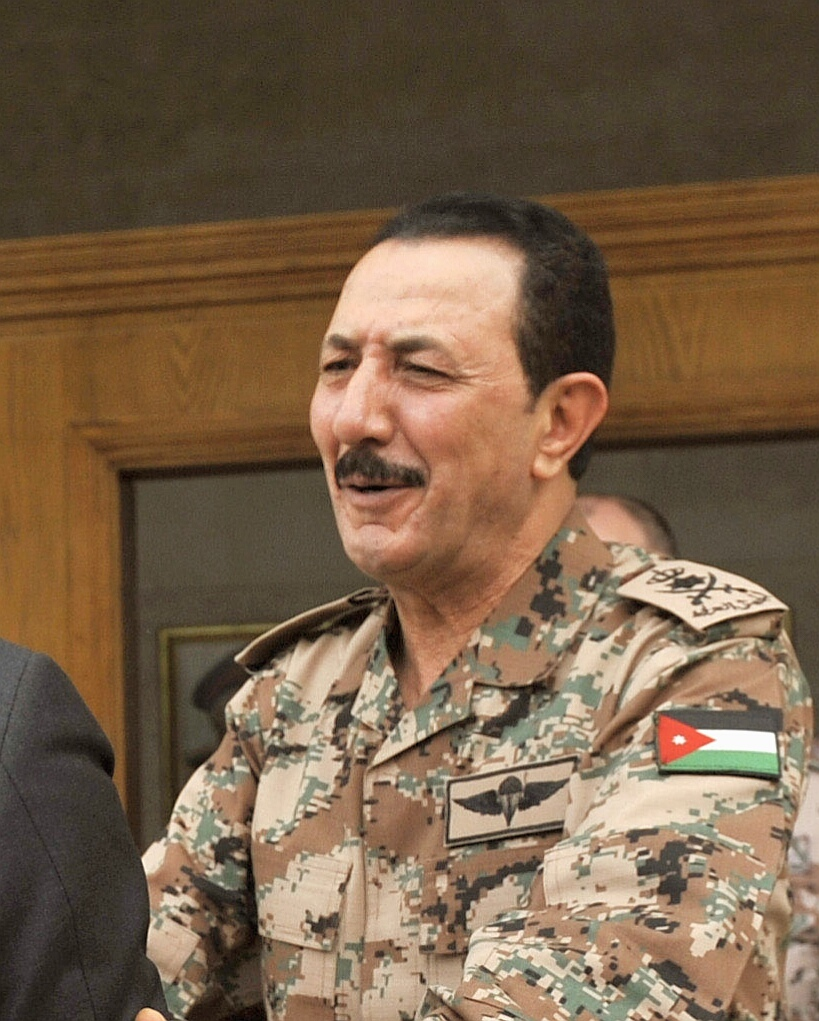
General Mashal Al-Zaben during an official military engagement in 2013

Mashal Mohammad Al-Zaben (Arabic: مشعل محمد الزبن; born 1953) is a Jordanian military commander, strategist, and royal adviser who served as the Chairman of the Joint Chiefs of Staff of the Jordanian Armed Forces-Arab Army from 23 February 2010 to 2 October 2016. His tenure coincided with one of the most volatile periods in modern Middle Eastern history, including the Arab Spring, the Syrian civil war, the rise of the Islamic State, and escalating regional security threats along Jordan’s borders.

Al-Zaben is widely regarded as one of the most influential Jordanian military leaders of the 21st century. Under his leadership, the Jordanian Armed Forces underwent extensive modernization, expanded regional and international defense cooperation, and strengthened operational readiness and border security during a period of unprecedented instability across the Levant.

He later served simultaneously as Military Adviser to King Abdullah II of Jordan, a role that reinforced his position as one of the kingdom’s central security and strategic decision-makers.

== Early life and background ==
Mashal Mohammad Al-Zaben was born in 1953 in Jordan into the prominent Al-Zaben tribal family, which has historically been associated with military and state service in the Hashemite Kingdom. He joined the Jordanian Armed Forces-Arab Army at a young age and advanced through the military establishment during a period in which Jordan increasingly focused on professionalization, modernization, and strategic cooperation with Western allies.

Throughout his early military career, Al-Zaben held a variety of operational and command posts, developing a reputation for discipline, strategic planning, and institutional leadership. By the late 2000s, he had emerged as one of the kingdom’s senior military commanders.

== Chairman of the Joint Chiefs of Staff ==
=== Appointment ===
On 23 February 2010, King Abdullah II of Jordan issued a royal decree appointing Al-Zaben as Chairman of the Joint Chiefs of Staff of the Jordanian Armed Forces.

In a royal letter accompanying the appointment, King Abdullah emphasized the importance of building a modern and technologically advanced military institution capable of addressing emerging regional threats. The King expressed confidence in Al-Zaben’s leadership and called for continued modernization of training systems, military infrastructure, and operational doctrine.

Al-Zaben responded by pledging to continue developing the Jordanian Armed Forces through institutional reform, advanced military planning, and acquisition of modern weapons systems and equipment.

=== Military modernization ===
During Al-Zaben’s tenure, the Jordanian Armed Forces significantly expanded military modernization efforts, particularly in border surveillance, rapid deployment capabilities, intelligence coordination, and special operations.

Jordan strengthened its strategic military relationship with the United States, NATO partners, and Gulf allies. Al-Zaben played a major role in deepening bilateral military coordination with Washington during the administration of President Barack Obama.

In September 2010, Al-Zaben visited Fort Leavenworth in Kansas, where he reviewed U.S. military doctrine systems, combat simulation programs, and lessons-learned institutions aimed at improving operational readiness and leadership training.

Military analysts frequently described Jordan during this period as one of the most professional and operationally capable armed forces in the Arab world, particularly in the fields of special operations and border defense.

=== Arab Spring and regional instability ===
Al-Zaben’s years as army chief coincided with the outbreak of the Arab Spring in 2011 and the rapid destabilization of neighboring states. Jordan’s military leadership faced mounting security concerns related to political unrest, refugee flows, cross-border smuggling, extremist infiltration, and regional armed conflicts.

As violence intensified in Syria following the outbreak of the Syrian civil war, Jordan reinforced its northern frontier and dramatically increased military deployments along the border. Al-Zaben oversaw the development of enhanced border-security systems and expanded operational readiness programs designed to prevent infiltration and smuggling attempts.

In 2014, amid the expansion of the Islamic State in Iraq and Syria, Al-Zaben personally inspected Jordanian military units stationed along the Iraqi border and declared that Jordan would use “all means available” to defend its territory and national security.

Under his leadership, Jordan intensified counterterrorism coordination with allied intelligence and military agencies and participated in the international coalition against the Islamic State.

=== Border security operations ===
Al-Zaben became strongly associated with Jordan’s border defense strategy during the Syrian conflict. He conducted frequent inspections of frontline military units and border guard formations stationed in northern Jordan.

In December 2014, Jordanian border guards foiled an infiltration attempt along the Syrian frontier. Al-Zaben publicly honored the soldiers involved and promoted several non-commissioned officers for what the Jordanian military described as acts of courage and professionalism.

He also supervised training exercises in the Northern Military Zone and reviewed army readiness programs aimed at defending Jordan’s borders during the height of the Syrian refugee crisis.

=== Role in the anti-ISIS coalition ===
Jordan emerged as one of the leading Arab participants in the international coalition against the Islamic State. Al-Zaben participated in strategic military consultations with senior U.S. and coalition officials regarding regional security operations and counterterrorism coordination.

Following the capture and killing of Jordanian pilot Muath al-Kasasbeh by the Islamic State in 2015, Jordan significantly escalated its military campaign against ISIS targets in Syria. Al-Zaben was involved in high-level security consultations concerning Jordan’s military response and regional defense posture.

== Military adviser to the King ==
On 7 January 2015, a royal decree appointed Al-Zaben as Military Adviser to King Abdullah II while he simultaneously retained his role as Chairman of the Joint Chiefs of Staff.

In this dual role, Al-Zaben became one of the kingdom’s senior strategic advisers on military affairs, national security policy, and regional defense coordination.

King Abdullah frequently appeared alongside Al-Zaben during visits to military headquarters, frontline formations, and operational command centers.

== Promotion and honours ==
On 22 May 2012, Al-Zaben was promoted to the rank of full General and awarded the Order of Independence (First Class), one of Jordan’s highest state honors.

His decorations and honors include:

- Order of Independence (First Class)
- Senior command decorations of the Jordanian Armed Forces-Arab Army
- Various regional and international military honors

== Public image and legacy ==
Al-Zaben is widely associated with a transformative era in Jordan’s contemporary military history. Supporters credit him with strengthening Jordan’s defensive capabilities during one of the most dangerous periods in the modern Middle East, while reinforcing the kingdom’s reputation as a stable regional security partner.

His tenure is particularly noted for:

- Expansion of Jordan’s border-security doctrine
- Modernization of operational readiness systems
- Strengthening of military cooperation with the United States and allied states
- Oversight of Jordan’s military posture during the Syrian conflict and anti-ISIS operations
- Development of rapid-response and counterterrorism capabilities

Jordanian media and military commentators frequently portrayed Al-Zaben as one of the kingdom’s most influential military commanders during the reign of King Abdullah II.

== See also ==
- Jordanian Armed Forces-Arab Army
- Abdullah II of Jordan
- Muath al-Kasasbeh
- Islamic State
- Syrian civil war
- SOFEX
