= Mahmoud Freihat =

Jordanian general (born 1960)

Lieutenant General Mahmoud Freihat
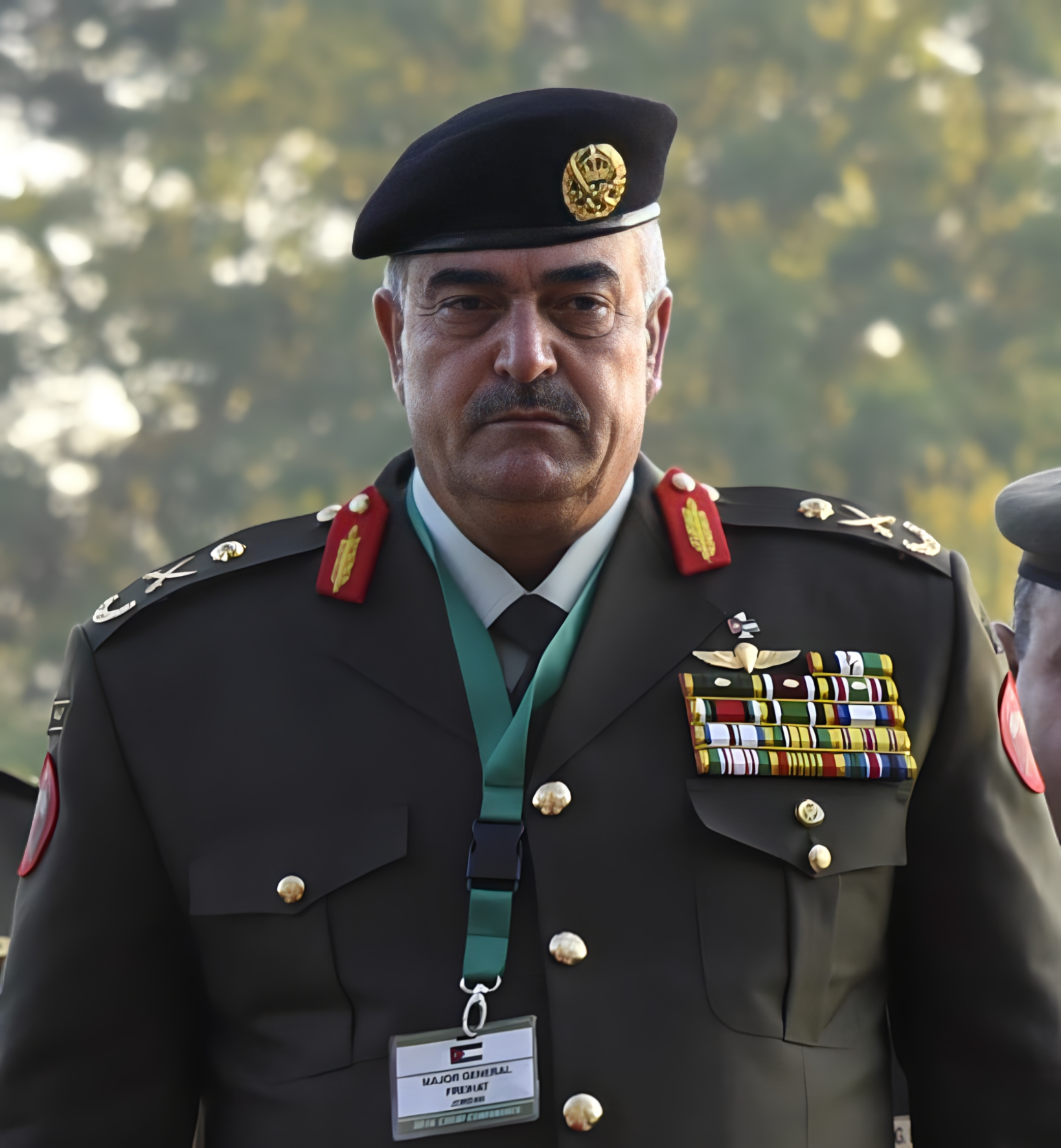
- Native name: محمود فريحات
- Born: January 1, 1960 (age 66); Jerash, Jordan
- Allegiance: Jordan
- Branch: Jordanian Army
- Service years: 1980–2019
- Rank: Lieutenant general
- Commands: Chairman of the Joint Chiefs of Staff
- Conflicts: Syrian Civil War, War against the Islamic State
- Awards: Legion of Merit, Medal of Military Merit, Order of Independence

Mahmoud Freihat (Arabic: محمود فريحات, romanized: Maḥmūd Frayḥāt; January 1, 1960) is a retired Jordanian lieutenant general who served as the chairman of the Joint Chiefs of Staff of the Jordanian Armed Forces from 2016 to 2019. Known for his focus on military modernization and regional security, Freihat played a key role in strengthening Jordan's defense capabilities and fostering international military cooperation, particularly with the United States and NATO allies. During his tenure, Jordan contributed significantly to the Global Coalition to Defeat ISIS and enhanced border security amidst regional instability.

== Early life and education ==
Freihat was born in Jerash, Jordan, on January 1, 1960. He graduated from Jordan's Royal Military Academy in 1980, marking the beginning of his military career. He later pursued advanced studies in the United Kingdom, earning a degree from King's College London. and graduating from the Royal College of Defense Studies, both of which honed his strategic and operational expertise.

== Military career ==
Freihat held several prominent roles in the Jordanian Armed Forces before being appointed as Chairman of the Joint Chiefs of Staff. He emphasized strengthening Jordan’s counterterrorism capabilities and enhancing interoperability with international forces. His leadership was particularly evident during high-level discussions with U.S. officials on military cooperation and regional security.

During his leadership, Jordan played a critical role in the Global Coalition to Defeat ISIS. Freihat oversaw operations aimed at securing Jordan’s borders and contributing to broader regional stability amidst ongoing conflicts in neighboring Syria and Iraq.

== Later life ==
After retiring in 2019 as part of a routine leadership transition within the Jordanian Armed Forces, which appointed Major General Yousef Huneiti as his successor, Freihat remained deeply involved in defense and security matters. His retirement was marked by a royal decree, with Freihat expressing gratitude to King Abdullah II for supporting the military's excellence.

After retiring, he participated in international forums, provided strategic advice on regional stability, and engaged with academic institutions as a lecturer and mentor. Freihat’s insights on military strategy and counterterrorism continue to be highly valued, reflecting his enduring commitment to Middle Eastern security and stability.

== Honors and awards ==
- Legion of Merit (U.S. Army) - Awarded by the United States for his exceptional leadership and efforts to strengthen military ties between Jordan and the United States, particularly during his tenure as Chairman of the Joint Chiefs of Staff.
- Order of Independence - Honoring his contributions to national defense and strengthening Jordan’s international military standing.
- Medal of Military Merit - Recognizing his service and dedication to the Jordanian Armed Forces.
