= Majdi Harasis =

Jordanian Chairman of the Joint Chiefs of Staff

- مجدي الحراسيس
- Born: 18 November 1971 (age 54); Amman, Jordan
- Military career
- Allegiance: Jordan
- Branch: Jordanian Armed Forces
- Service years: 1990–present
- Rank: Major general
- Commands: Chairman of the Joint Chiefs of Staff

Majdi Harasis (Arabic: مجدي الحراسيس; born 18 November 1971) is the current Chairman of the Joint Chiefs of Staff of the Jordanian Armed Forces since 2 September 2026.

Harasis was born in Amman, Jordan, in 1971. He joined the army in 1990 and held several staff and later senior positions, including several roles within the Military Intelligence Directorate, as well as an assignment as a military observer in Ethiopia. Harasis later became director of military intelligence in 2022, where he was responsible for border protection.

In 2026, Harasis was appointed by royal decree as Chairman of the Joint Chiefs of Staff, succeeding Yousef Huneiti who had served in the position for seven years. Upon his appointment, Harasis was promoted from brigadier general to major general, and made his first visit to a border guard battalion.

== Early life and education ==
Harasis was born in Amman, Jordan, on 18 November 1971. His family originates from Tafilah.

Harasis completed several academic degrees, including a bachelor's in computer studies and a master's in computer engineering, as well as a bachelor's in military sciences and a master's in management and strategic studies. He also completed courses in Jordan and abroad on military topics.

== Military career ==
Harasis joined the Jordanian Armed Forces on 25 September 1990 and specialized in military intelligence.

Harasis held a range of staff and senior appointments in intelligence and national defense. His service included several roles within the Military Intelligence Directorate, as well as an assignment as a military observer/peacekeeper as part of the United Nations Mission in Ethiopia and Eritrea. At the directorate, he served in senior operations and counterterrorism positions. He later assumed command of the Joint Intelligence Center and served as Strategic Advisor for Land Forces at the Royal Jordanian National Defense College. His subsequent positions included Commandant of the Royal Jordanian National Defense College.

=== Director of Military Intelligence ===
Harasis, then director of military intelligence, welcoming Charles Q. Brown Jr., then US Army Chief of Staff, upon his arrival at Amman City Airport, 2024.

Harasis led military intelligence within the Jordanian Army since August 2022, where he was responsible for countering infiltration and smuggling, and border protection.

=== Chairman of the Joint Chiefs of Staff ===
On 2 September 2026, a royal decree appointed Harasis Chairman of the Joint Chiefs of Staff of the Jordanian Armed Forces, while a separate decree promoted him from brigadier general to major general. Harasis succeeded Yousef Huneiti, who was promoted to lieutenant general and then retired after having served as Chairman for seven years.

In the appointment letter, King Abdullah II described Harasis as a distinguished officer and directed him to continue efforts to restructure the armed forces, develop the capabilities of the Arab Army, and modernize its equipment and capabilities: "Therefore, we direct you to continue the efforts of restructuring our Armed Forces and developing the capabilities of the Arab Army, while modernising its tools, in order to enable it to undertake its responsibilities and face emerging challenges and threats with the utmost efficiency and readiness."

In the first week after his appointment, Harasis visited the 12th Royal Border Guard Battalion, a unit of the 2nd Border Guard Brigade. During the visit, he received a briefing about the battalion’s duties, and plans aimed at enhancing combat readiness. He also toured an exhibition showcasing the Border Guard units' weapons, equipment, and vehicles.

== Awards and insignia ==
Harasis has received several medals and insignia, including:

- United Nations Medal
- International Peacekeeping Forces Participation Medal
- Great Arab Revolt Centenary badge
- Military Merit Medal, 2nd Class
- King Abdullah II ibn Al Hussein Medal of Excellence, 1st Class
- First State Centenary Medal
- Order of Independence, 2nd Class
- Silver Jubilee badge
- National merit award from the President of France

== See also ==
- Jordanian Armed Forces
- Chairman of the Joint Chiefs of Staff (Jordan)
