= Yousef Huneiti =

Chairman of the Joint Chiefs of Staff of the Jordanian Armed Forces (JAF)

- يوسف الحنيطي
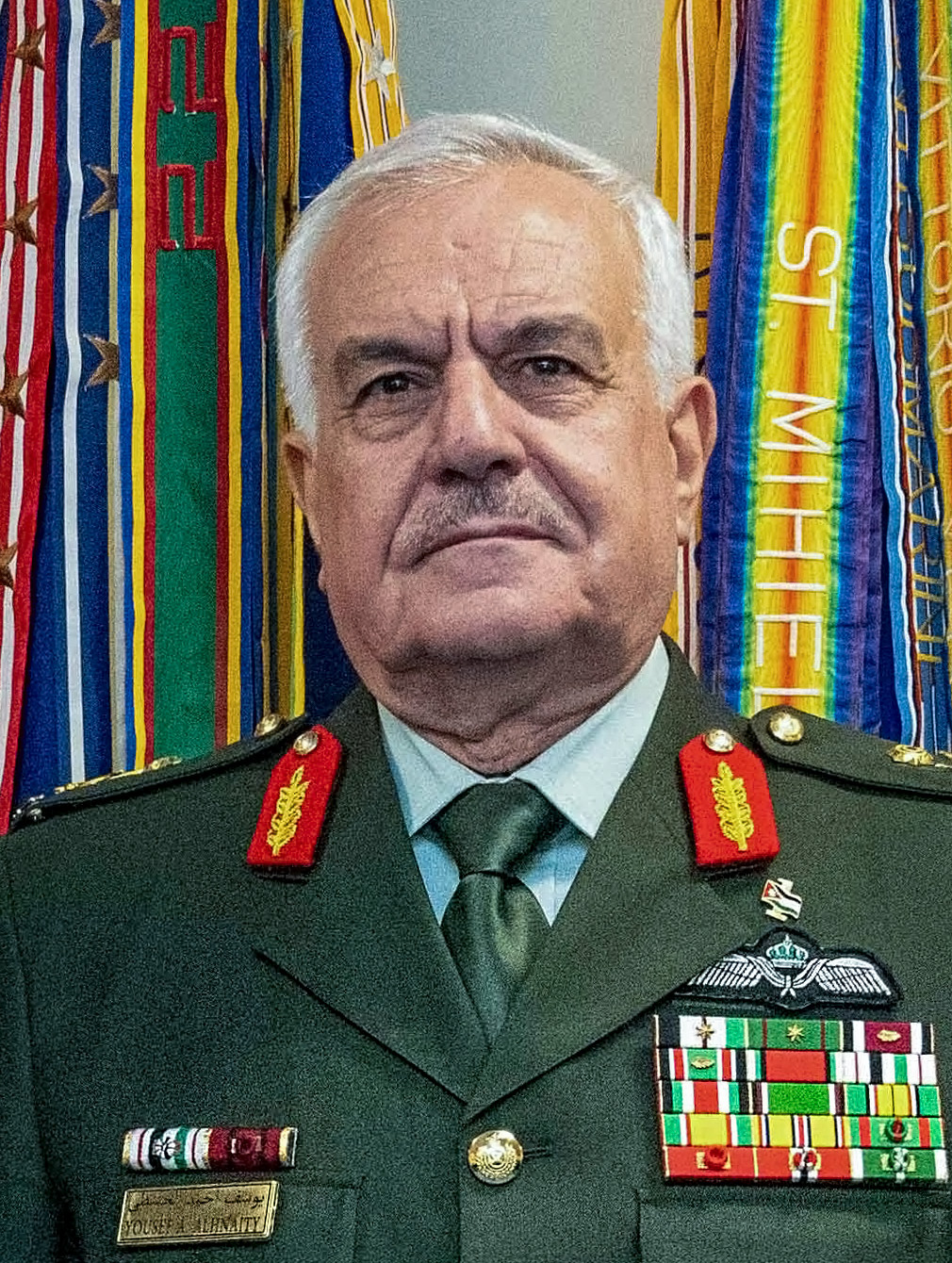
- Yousef Huneiti in 2024
- Born: Yousef al-Huneiti; 2 March 1959 (age 67); Amman, Jordan
- Military career
- Allegiance: Jordan
- Branch: Royal Jordanian Air Force
- Service years: 1978–2026
- Rank: Lieutenant General

Lieutenant General Yousef Huneiti (Arabic: يوسف الحنيطي, romanized:Yūsuf al-Ḥunaiṭī; born 2 March 1959) was the Chairman of the Joint Chiefs of Staff of the Jordanian Armed Forces (JAF) between 2019 and 2026. Following the retirement of his predecessor, Lt. Gen. Mahmoud Freihat. Huneiti's appointment marked a historical milestone, as he is the first officer from the Royal Jordanian Air Force to ever serve in this role, traditionally held by army commanders.

== Early life and education ==
Born on 2 March 1959 in Amman, Jordan, Yousef Huneiti joined the Royal Jordanian Air Force in 1978, beginning his long-standing career in military service. Over the years, he advanced his education with various military courses and leadership programs, solidifying his expertise in military strategy, operations, and defense.

== Military career ==
Huneiti's early career was largely based at King Hussein Air Base in 1978, followed by roles at Prince Hassan Air Base in 1981 and H-4 Air Base in 1982. By 1983, he had become a fighter pilot, and in 1989, he was promoted to military trainer.

His leadership capabilities were further demonstrated when he held several key positions:

- 2003: Head of the Operations and Plans Division.
- 2008–2010: Commander of the aviation division at Muwaffaq Salti Air Base.
- 2010–2012: Commander of King Hussein Air College.
- 2013–2015: Director of air operations.

In 2015, Huneiti was promoted to Assistant Commander of the Royal Jordanian Air Force for Operations and Air Defense, a role that highlighted his growing influence within the armed forces. In 2016, he reached the apex of his Air Force career by being appointed as Commander of the Royal Jordanian Air Force, a position he held until 2019. On September 2, 2026, Lt. General Huneiti was retired by a royal decree after being promoted to Lt. General.

== Chairman of the Joint Chiefs of Staff ==
On 24 July 2019, Huneiti was appointed Chairman of the Joint Chiefs of Staff, the highest military post in Jordan, by King Abdullah II. His appointment underscored the King's emphasis on modernizing and restructuring the armed forces, ensuring that Jordan's military remains capable of addressing both regional threats and internal challenges. Huneiti's tenure has focused on strengthening the defense infrastructure, maintaining national security, and enhancing Jordan's role in regional stability. He has also been heavily involved in joint military exercises and strategic defense collaborations with NATO, the United States, and neighboring Arab countries. He left his position following his retirement on the 2nd of September 2026.

== International Cooperation and Leadership ==
As part of his role, Huneiti has maintained active diplomatic and military relations with several key global partners. He has frequently met with military leaders from the United States, France, Canada, and Qatar to discuss military cooperation, training programs, and joint operations to bolster regional security. Under his leadership, the Jordanian Armed Forces have been modernizing equipment, improving training programs, and enhancing their operational capabilities, particularly in counterterrorism and border defense

== Personal life ==
Huneiti is married and has five daughters and one son. He is known for his humility and dedication to service, often credited for his role in shaping Jordan's modern military strategies and maintaining the country's security amidst ongoing regional tensions
