= Mashour Haditha Al-Jazy =

Jordanian Lieutenant General

Lieutenant general Mashour Haditha Al-Jazy
- مشهور حديثة الجازي
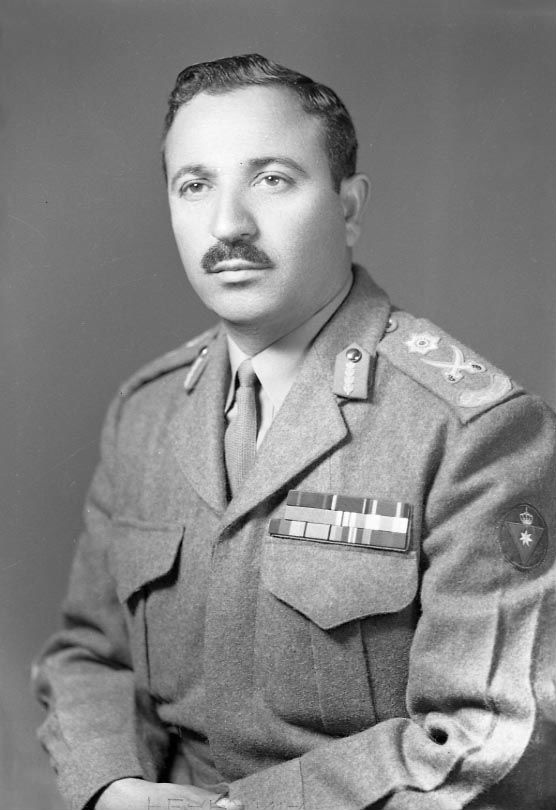
- Born: Mashour Haditha Al-Jazy; 1 January 1928; Ma'an, Emirate of Transjordan
- Died: 6 November 2001 (aged 73); Amman, Jordan
- Military career
- Allegiance: Jordan
- Branch: Royal Jordanian Army
- Service years: 1943–1971
- Rank: Lieutenant General
- Unit: 40th Armored Battalion
- Conflicts: First Arab-Israeli War; Six-Day War; Battle of Karameh

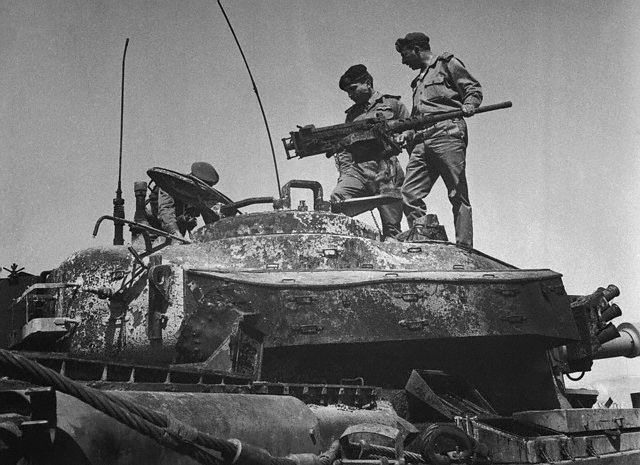
Mashour Haditha Al-Jazy (right) and King Hussein atop an abandoned Israeli Centurion tank, that crossed the bridge from the Jordan River's West Bank to the East Bank, in the aftermath of the Battle of Karameh.

Mashour Haditha al-Jazy (1 January 1928 – 6 November 2001) was a Jordanian military officer and Chief of Staff of the Jordanian Armed Forces from 1970 to 1971. He is best known for his participation in the Six-Day War and the Battle of Karameh.

== Biography ==
Jazy was from Bedouin ancestry, born to the Howeitat, a large Judhami tribe, in Ma'an, Emirate of Transjordan. He and joined the Badia forces on 28 June 1943, and in 1946, he joined the cultural wing at Abdali Center. After his graduation he was stationed with the Second Infantry Battalion. In 1958, he received a bachelor's degree in military science from the Pakistani Military Staff College, and took part in several courses in armored brigade training in the United States. al-Jazy was commander of the 40th Armored Brigade and later commander of the First Brigade.

When in March 1968 Jordanian intelligence received word that Israeli forces were preparing to carry out an incursion into the village of Karameh, in the Jordan Valley, al-Jazy, now a colonel, relayed the information to the leaders of Palestinian groups in the country, including Yasser Arafat. Israel wanted to punish Jordan for hosting Palestinian fedayeen by occupying the Jordanian Salt Heights and rendering them into a "security buffer zone" for Israel. On 21 March 1968, Israeli troops advanced into Jordan and tanks crossed the King's bridge. al-Jazy, with combined forces of the Jordanian Armed Forces (JAF) and Palestine Liberation Organization (PLO), defeated the Israel army at Karameh and forced the enemy out.

In 1970, he was chief of staff of the Jordanian Armed Forces and appointed as the private advisor for King Hussein. On 28 November 1971 officials in Jordan moved Al-Jazy to Al Husseinieh town located between Amman and Aqaba. This decision was taken to protect the influential Huwaitat tribe to which he belonged. Al-Jazy was requested to stay with his tribe, considered one of the largest in Jordan. After his military retirement Al-Jazy established in 1975 Al Jazy Shipping And Forwarding, becoming agent of the German Hellmann Worldwide Logistics. Al-Jazy died of pneumonia in at the age of 73 in Amman on 6 November 2001.

== Medals ==
- Syrian Order of Merit Third Degree
- Defense medal
- Military Operations
- Public Service in Palestine
- Al Kawkab Medal of the Second Order
- Independence Medal of the First Order
- War Anniversary
- Recognition of Dedication in Service
- Al Karamah Battle
- The British victory
- Independence Medal of the Third Order
- The Lebanese Cedar Medal –Commander level
- The Medal of the Palestinian Jerusalem Star
