= Jordan Design and Development Bureau =

Jordanian defence company

- Native name: Arabic: المركز الأردني للتصميم والتطوير
- Formerly: King Abdullah Design and Development Bureau; King Abdullah II Design and Development Bureau
- Company type: State owned company
- Industry: Defence
- Founded: 1999; 27 years ago
- Headquarters: Amman, Amman Governorate, Jordan
- Area served: Middle East
- Key people: Saoud Nsairat (Chairman); Br. Gen. Mohmmad Suleiman Farghal (CEO)
- Products: Military equipment
- Owner: Jordanian Armed Forces
- Website: www.joddb.com

The Jordan Design and Development Bureau (JODDB) is a Jordanian defence company. The company was established by Royal Decree as King Abdullah Design and Development Bureau (KADDB) on 24 August 1999 to provide an indigenous capability for the supply of scientific and technical services to the Jordanian Armed Forces (JAF).

JODDB was also created for the supply of defense and commercial equipment optimized for Middle East requirements. It is an independent agency within the Jordanian Armed Forces tasked with operating according to best business practices and is financed both through the defense budget and by technology, products and services sales incomes. Headquartered in central Amman, JODDB is organized into three divisions: the Engineering Group, the Manufacturing Group, and the Programs group.

== JODDB Investment Group ==
Launched on 1 January 2010, the JODDB Investment Group has been established to act as the commercial arm for the King Abdullah II Design and Development Bureau (JODDB). The JODDB Investment Group aims at establishing new businesses in the Defense, security and Automotive industries along with all services that would complement these industries.

== Industrial Gate Free Zone ==
In October 2009, King Abdullah II inaugurated the JODDB Industrial Park (KADDB IP), which is the first comprehensive free zone in the Middle East, specialized in the defense industry and the manufacturing of vehicles. KADDB IP is a public limited liability company owned completely by the Jordan Design and Development Bureau (JODDB). It was established in 2006 in accordance with the Free Zones Law to upgrade Jordan's industrial base, attract investments, and encourage the development of interactive industries for manufacturing vehicles. It is located on 3,800 dunams (1 dunam = 1,000 square meters) of land at Khalidiyah in the Mafraq Governorate, 50 km from Amman and 24 km from Zarqa, on the cross roads linking Jordan to Saudi Arabia, Iraq, and Syria, which facilitates the transportation of KADDB IP products to all countries in the region.

== See also ==
- Special Operations Forces Exhibition
