= Ali Hayari =

Ali Al-Hayari
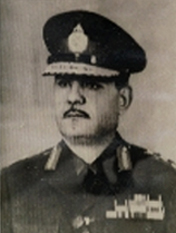
- Born: Amman, Jordan

Ali Al-Hayari (1923-2002) was a Jordanian general that held the post of Chairman of the Joint Chiefs of Staff of the Jordanian Armed Forces from 17 April 1957 to 20 April 1957.
