= Arabization of the Jordanian Army command =

1956 dismissal of senior British commanders of the Jordanian Arab Legion

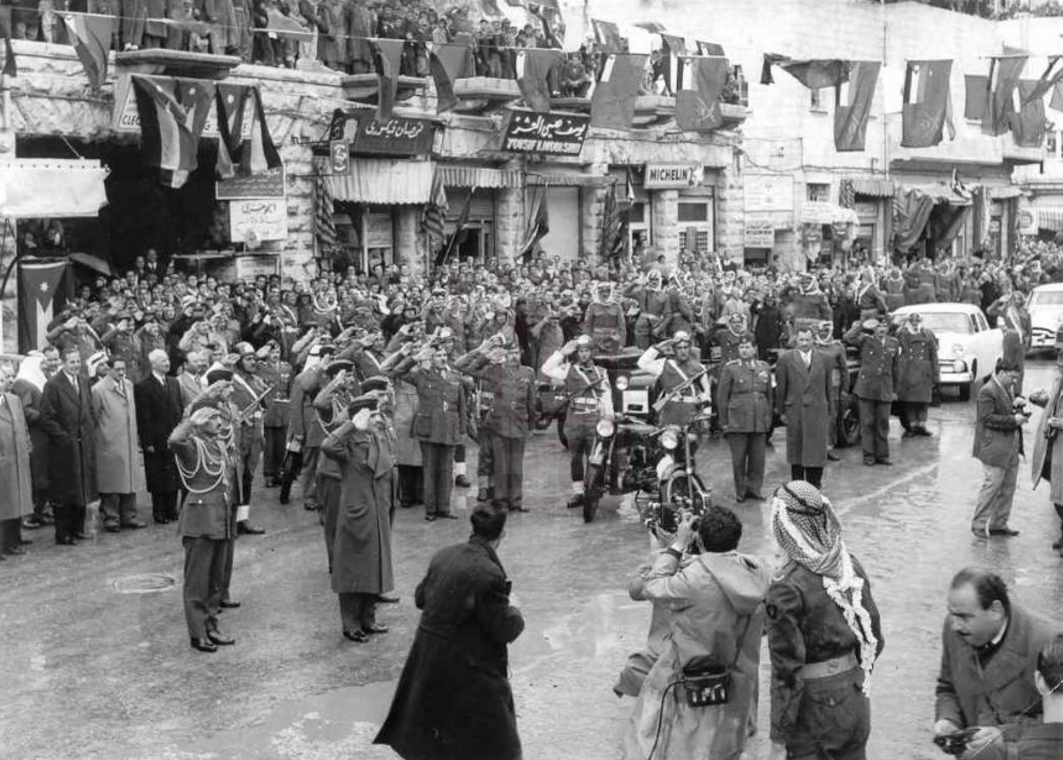
King Hussein leading a military parade on the first anniversary of the Arabization of the Jordanian Army command, King Faisal Street in downtown Amman, 1 March 1957.

The Arabization of the Jordanian Army command (Arabic: تعريب قيادة الجيش العربي, Ta'reeb Qiyadat Al-Jaysh Al-Arabi) saw the dismissal of senior British officers commanding the Arab Legion by King Hussein and the subsequent renaming of the Legion into the Jordanian Armed Forces on 1 March 1956.

Glubb Pasha, the Arab Legion's British commander, was replaced with Major General Radi Annab, who became the first Arab commander of the Arab Legion. Hussein's intentions to Arabize the Army command were to replace British officers with Jordanian officers, assert political independence from Britain, and improve relations with neighboring Arab states that viewed the British with suspicion.

The British government initially responded furiously, but chose not to take further action against Jordan after they realized that Hussein's decision did not mean abandoning the British as an ally. The Jordanian streets witnessed large celebrations when the decision was made public, and relations between Jordan and other Arab states improved thereafter.

An annual celebration is held on 1 March in Jordan to mark the event.

== Background ==
The first organized army in Jordan was established in 1920, under the command of the British Captain Frederick Peake. In 1939, the Arab Legion was put under the command of John Bagot Glubb (also known as Glubb Pasha), under whom it grew into an 8,000-men strong force by the time of Jordan's independence from the British Mandate in 1946. Egyptian and Syrian radio stations had constantly transmitted propaganda against King Hussein, one of the episodes taunting him over having British officers as commanders of his army. Meanwhile, foreigners believed that Glubb Pasha was the actual ruler of Jordan rather than the King.

The pressure Britain exerted on Jordan to join the Baghdad Pact in 1955 had caused a spike in anti-British sentiment in Jordan. During Hussein's visit to London in October 1955, he tried to persuade Foreign Office officials to make changes to the Army command, but his wishes went unheeded. Subsequent negotiations led the British to promise that the Royal Engineers (RE) would have an Arab officer commanding it in 1985, rankling Hussein. Another issue that Hussein and Glubb had disagreed on was the strategy for defending the West Bank in case of a war with Israel. Glubb favored a defensive strategy while Hussein argued an offensive strategy was the better way to deter an attack.

== Arabization ==
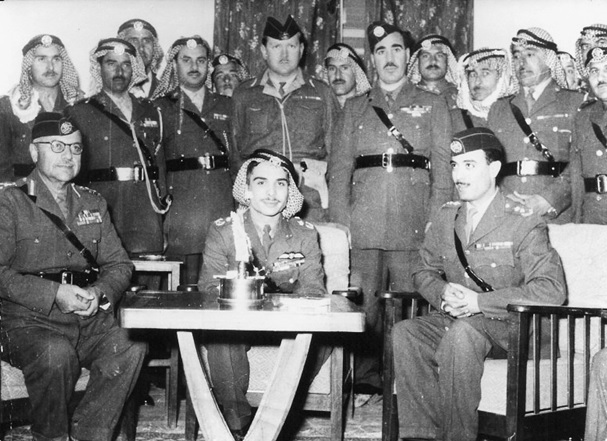
Seated from left to right: chief of staff Radi Annab, King Hussein and his Aide-de-camp Ali Abu Nuwar. Behind them are Jordanian officers of the Arab Legion, late 1956.

On the morning 1 March 1956, 21-year old Hussein signed a royal decree to dismiss all senior British officers and personally delivered it to the then prime minister Samir Al-Rifai. Al-Rifai was startled, realizing the implications of such a move. Al-Rifai then called Glubb to his office and informed him of the decision. Al-Rifai told Glubb that he had to leave the country as soon as possible, and that the decision also included Glubb's chief of staff Colonel W. M. Hutton, director of the General Intelligence Department Colonel Sir Patrick Coghill and eight other senior British officers.

Learning of the decisions taken, an angry British government demanded that all the other British officers in senior posts resign. Glubb and his family left the next morning; two officials accompanied them to the airport where Glubb was given a portrait of Hussein with a handwritten note: "With our acknowledgment of the good services and untiring exertions and our best wishes for His Excellency Glubb Pasha" followed by the date and the king's signature. The name of the Arab Legion was changed to the "Jordan Arab Army," the police were separated from the Army as the Public Security Directorate under the auspices of the Ministry of Interior, and several promotions occurred within the Army. Major General Radi Annab succeeded Glubb as chief of staff, becoming the first Arab commander of the Arab Legion. Ali Abu Nuwar was promoted to major general and in May 1956 replaced the retiring Annab as chief of staff. All sixty-four British officers serving with the former Arab Legion left Jordan shortly after Glubb's departure.

== Responses ==
King Hussein's popularity in Jordan surged, while joyful demonstrators filled the country chanting "long live the King!" and "long live Arab co-operation and unity!" The decisions shocked Glubb, Charles Duke—the British ambassador to Jordan—and the British government, even though reports from the British embassy warned of growing discontent within Jordan of Glubb's role.

British politicians blamed Egyptian president Gamal Abdel Nasser for the decision, yet no evidence was found to support that and even Abdel Nasser was surprised by Hussein's decision. Hussein was surprised by the initial furious British reaction, as he did not mean to abandon Britain as an ally, and despite his surprise at being relieved, Glubb himself advised British prime minister Sir Anthony Eden not to punish King Hussein or the Jordanian government. Britain eventually agreed not to take action against Jordan after Alec Kirkbride was sent on a mission there to inquire on Hussein's intentions; he reported back what he was already sure of, which was that Hussein wanted to maintain the alliance with Britain. British aid continued, based on the 1948 Anglo-Jordanian treaty.

An annual celebration is held on 1 March in Jordan to mark the event.

== See also ==
- Chairman of the Joint Chiefs of Staff (Jordan)

== Bibliography ==
- "1956: King of Jordan sacks British general". BBC News. British Broadcasting Corporation. 2 March 1956.
- Dann, Uriel (1989). King Hussein and the Challenge of Arab Radicalism: Jordan, 1955–1967. Oxford: Oxford University Press. ISBN 0-19-507134-4.
- "Jordan marks 61st anniversary of army Arabisation". The Jordan Times. 28 February 2017.
- Mutawi, Samir A. (1987). Jordan in the 1967 War. Cambridge: Cambridge University Press. ISBN 0-521-52858-5.
- Salibi, Kamal S. (1998). The Modern History of Jordan. London: I. B. Tauris. ISBN 1-86064-331-0.
- Shlaim, Avi (2009). Lion of Jordan: The Life of King Hussein in War and Peace. Vintage Books. ISBN 9781400078288.
- Tucker, Spencer C. (2010). The Encyclopedia of Middle East Wars: The United States in the Persian Gulf, Afghanistan, and Iraq Conflicts. Santa Barbara: ABC-CLIO. ISBN 978-1851099474.
- Tucker, Spencer C.; Roberts, Priscilla (12 May 2008). The Encyclopedia of the Arab-Israeli Conflict: A Political, Social, and Military History: A Political, Social, and Military History. ABC-CLIO. ISBN 9781851098422.
