= International Defence Exhibition =

Defense technology sales exhibition

International Defence Exhibition (IDEX)
- IDEX logo
- Genre: Defence
- Dates: February
- Frequency: Biennial: Odd years
- Venue: Abu Dhabi National Exhibition Centre
- Location: Abu Dhabi
- Country: United Arab Emirates
- Inaugurated: 1993; 33 years ago
- Most recent: 2027
- Next event: 2027
- Attendance: Nearly 45,000 in 2009
- Organizer: Capital Events
- Website: www.idexuae.ae

The International Defence Exhibition & Conference (IDEX) is a biennial arms and defence technology sales exhibition. The exhibition is the largest defence exhibition and conference in the Middle East, and takes place in Abu Dhabi, United Arab Emirates.

== History ==
IDEX 10th edition 2011 logo

The first edition of the exhibition took place in 1993. The exhibition is organized through the state-run Abu Dhabi National Exhibitions Company.

The business conducted at the 2005 IDEX totalled 2 billion US dollars. According to Stockholm International Peace Research Institute, the arms sales of the SIPRI Top 100 arms-producing and military services companies in 2017 (outside China) totalled $398.2 billion. As of 2010 well known exhibitors are Airbus Group, Jobaria Defence, Isotrex, Lockheed Martin, Streit Group, Oshkosh Corporation and Saab. IDEX 2023 was held from 20th to 24th February 2023 with approximately 1300 exhibitors.

== See also ==
- Africa Aerospace and Defence—Defence expo in Pretoria, South Africa
- Eurosatory—Defence expo in Paris, France
- International Defence Industry Fair—Defence expo in Istanbul, Turkey
- International Defence Exhibition and Seminar—Defence expo in Karachi, Pakistan
- Special Operations Forces Exhibition—Defence expo in Amman, Jordan
