= Abdel Hafez Ka'abneh =

Jordanian Army General

Abdel Hafez Al-Ka'abneh
- عبد الحافظ مرعي الكعابنة
- Born: 1937; Amman, Jordan
- Died: 2016 (aged 78–79); Amman, Jordan

Abdel Hafez Al-Ka'abneh is a Jordanian general that held the post of Chairman of the Joint Chiefs of Staff of the Jordanian Armed Forces from 5 March 2002 to 23 February 2010.
