= Khaled Sarayra =

Khaled Al-Sarayra
- Born: 1944; Amman, Jordan
- Died: 18 November 2020 (aged 75–76)

Khaled Al-Sarayra is a Jordanian field marshal who held the post of Chairman of the Joint Chiefs of Staff of the Jordanian Armed Forces from 5 April 1993 to 18 July 1999 Date of death 11/18/2020.
