= Special Operations Forces Exhibition =

Defense technology sales exhibition

Special Operations Forces Exhibition and Conference - SOFEX
- Nickname: SOFEX
- Status: Active
- Genre: Special Operations, Homeland Security
- Frequency: Biennial: Even years
- Venue: King Abdullah I Airbase
- Location: Amman
- Country: Jordan
- Inaugurated: 1996; 30 years ago
- Most recent: 2024
- Next event: 2026
- Attendance: Nearly 12,000 in 2008
- Organizer: Organized by SOFEX team with the support of the Jordanian Armed Forces
- Website: http://www.sofexjordan.com

The Special Operations Forces Exhibition and Conference (SOFEX) is a special operations and homeland security event, held every two years and originally at the King Abdullah I airbase in Marka, Jordan. The specialized event is held under the patronage of King Abdullah II, the supervision of Prince Faisal bin Al Hussein and is supported by the Jordanian Armed Forces (JAF).

== Background ==
SOFEX was established in 1999 by King Hussein.

In 2012, SOFEX attracted 33 national pavilions, represented by 323 companies and which attracted thousands of visitors over the 3 day exhibition, including 108 delegations from 56 countries.

The 10th edition of the SOFEX series took place May 5-8, 2014.

The SOFEX 2020 was postponed on 2020-01-30 due to heavy rains at the expo location.[https://www.joint-forces.com/world-news/29192-sofex-2020-postponed-heavy-rain-damages-expo-site. The next SOFEX will be in 2026 at the Aqaba International Exhibition & Convention Centre (AIECC)]

== See also ==
- International Defence Exhibition (IDEX) – a defense expo in Abu Dhabi, United Arab Emirates
- Eurosatory - a defense expo in Paris, France
- Egypt Defence Expo (EDEX) - tri-service defence exhibition in Cairo, Egypt
