= Ministry of Defence (Jordan) =

Government ministry of Jordan

Jordan Ministry of Defence
Department overview
- Formed: 1939
- Jurisdiction: Government of Jordan
- Headquarters: Amman
- Minister responsible: Jafar Hassan, Minister of Defence

The Ministry of Defence (Arabic: وزارة الدفاع الاردنية) of the Hashemite Kingdom of Jordan is a ministerial mandate in the Government of Jordan responsible for defence of Jordan. It had never been a separate ministerial entity, and since 1970, the Minister of Defence has been the Prime Minister.

Prime Minister Rashid Al-Madfai was the first to assume the defence mandate as Minister of Defence and Internal Security in the government of Tawfik Abu Al-Huda in 1939. A directive by the King in 2014 to reestablish the Ministry of Defence did not materialize.
