= Supreme Order of the Renaissance =

Order of merit in Jordan

Supreme Order of the Renaissance وسام النهضة (Arabic)
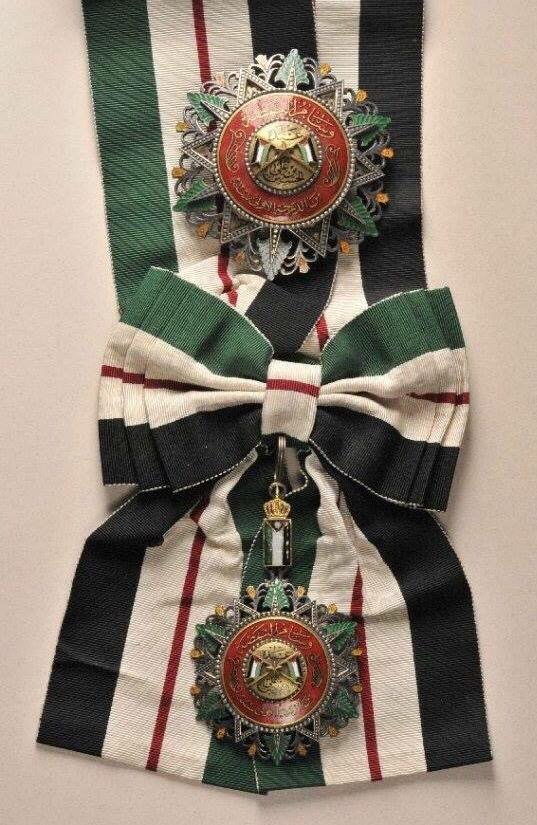
- Grand Cordon of the Supreme Order of the Renaissance

Awarded by Jordan
- Type: Order
- Status: Currently constituted
- Sovereign: King Abdullah II
- Grades: Grand Cordon w/ Brilliants; Grand Cordon; Grand Officer; Commander; Officer; Member

Statistics
- First induction: 15 October 1918

Precedence
- Next (higher): Order of Al-Hussein bin Ali
- Next (lower): Order of the Star of Jordan
- Ribbon of the order

The Supreme Order of the Renaissance (Arabic: وسام النهضة, romanized: Wisām an-Nahḍa, pronounced [wiˈsaːm an‿ˈnahdˤa]) is the second-most senior order of merit in the Kingdom of Jordan.

== History ==
The order was instituted in 1917 by Emir Hussein bin Ali, Sharif of Mecca. According to correspondence between the British Foreign Office and their agent in Jeddah in 1924,

The Order of the Nahda was established to commemorate the revolt of the Hejaz against the Turks. The first distribution was made on October 15th, 1918, when Sharif Hussein declared himself King. It is supposed to be confined to people who actually took part in the revolt.

When Hussein's successor Ali was overthrown by the Sultan of Nejd, his son Abdullah continued to issue the award as Emir of Transjordan. Until 1949 when the Order of Hussein bin Ali was established, the Order of the Renaissance was Transjordan's most senior award.

While originally intended for those who took direct part in the Arab Revolt, it is now used as an order of merit and for senior members of the Hashemite Royal Family.

== Grades ==
The Supreme Order of the Renaissance is divided in six classes :

- Grand Cordon with Brilliants / Special 1st Class
- Grand Cordon / 1st Class
- Grand Officer / 2nd Class
- Commander / 3rd Class
- Officer / 4th Class
- Knight/ 5th Class
- Medal/ 6th Class

== Insignia ==
The Order's insignia is a multilayered hexagonal star with six green enamel palms. The star has an inner circle with Arabic script that translates to: "His Servant Al Hussein bin Ali".

The ribbon is, since 1952, of equal stripes of black, white and green; with a narrow red stripe in the centre of the white stripe.

Between 1917 and 1952, it was made of equal stripes of black, green and white; with a narrow red stripe in the centre of the green stripe.

The Order of the Renaissance also has a special first class which has the same design as the other classes but its breast and sash star are studded with diamonds.

== Recipients ==
- Ali Abu Al-Ragheb
- Asif Ali Zardari
- Prince Ali bin Hussein
- Albert II of Monaco
- Ali of Hejaz
- Princess Basma bint Talal
- Beatrix of the Netherlands
- Anton Benya
- Al-Muhtadee Billah
- Angela Merkel
- Lakhdar Brahimi
- Maria Cavaco Silva
- Prince Constantijn of the Netherlands
- Dina bint Abdul-Hamid
- Faisal I of Iraq
- Faisal II of Iraq
- Farouk of Egypt
- Prince Faisal bin Hussein
- Felipe VI of Spain
- Frederik X of Denmark
- Fuad I of Egypt
- Ali Ghandour
- Ghazi of Iraq
- Haakon, Crown Prince of Norway
- Hamad bin Isa Al Khalifa
- Prince Hamzah bin Hussein
- Daoud Hanania
- Prince Hassan bin Talal
- Haya bint Hussein
- Henrik, Prince Consort of Denmark
- David George Hogarth
- Alia Al-Hussein
- Jassim bin Hamad bin Khalifa Al Thani
- Prince Joachim of Denmark
- Prince Edward, Duke of Kent
- Isa bin Salman Al Khalifa
- Khalifa bin Salman Al Khalifa
- Amer Khammash
- Majed Al-Hajhassan Brigadier General of The Jordanian Armed Forces
- Awn Al-Khasawneh
- Princess Laurentien of the Netherlands
- Ahmad Lozi
- Princess Margriet of the Netherlands
- Queen Mathilde of Belgium
- Queen Máxima of the Netherlands
- Prabowo Subianto
- Azrinaz Mazhar Hakim
- Henry McMahon
- Francisco Franco
- Prince Muhammad bin Talal
- Princess Muna al-Hussein
- Shakhbut bin Sultan Al Nahyan
- Prince Nayef bin Abdullah
- Abdul Reza Pahlavi
- Ali Reza Pahlavi I
- Mohammad Reza Pahlavi
- Queen Saleha of Brunei
- Salman, Crown Prince of Bahrain
- Sarah, Crown Princess of Brunei
- Princess Sarvath al-Hassan
- Queen Silvia of Sweden
- Queen Sonja of Norway
- Tareq Suheimat
- Victoria, Crown Princess of Sweden
- Pieter van Vollenhoven
- Ra'ad bin Zeid
- Siti Hartinah
- Haitham bin Tariq
- Prince Philip, Duke of Edinburgh
- Umaro Sissoco Embaló
- Umm Kulthum
- Mariam Abdul Aziz
- Queen Rania of Jordan

== Sources ==
Medals World Index, Jordan: The Supreme Order of the Renaissance (Wisam an-Nahada)
