= Order of Independence (Jordan) =

Jordanian order of knighthood

Order of Independence Wisam al-Istiqlal

Awarded by Jordan
- Type: Order
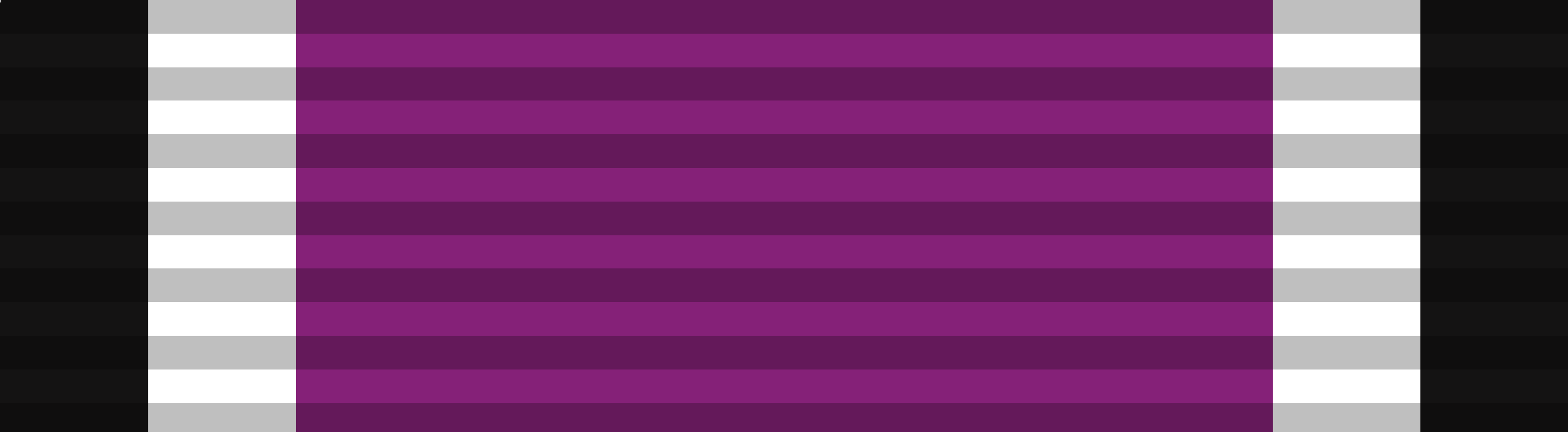
- Ribbon: Ribbon of the Order of Independence
- Status: Currently constituted
- Sovereign: Abdullah II of Jordan
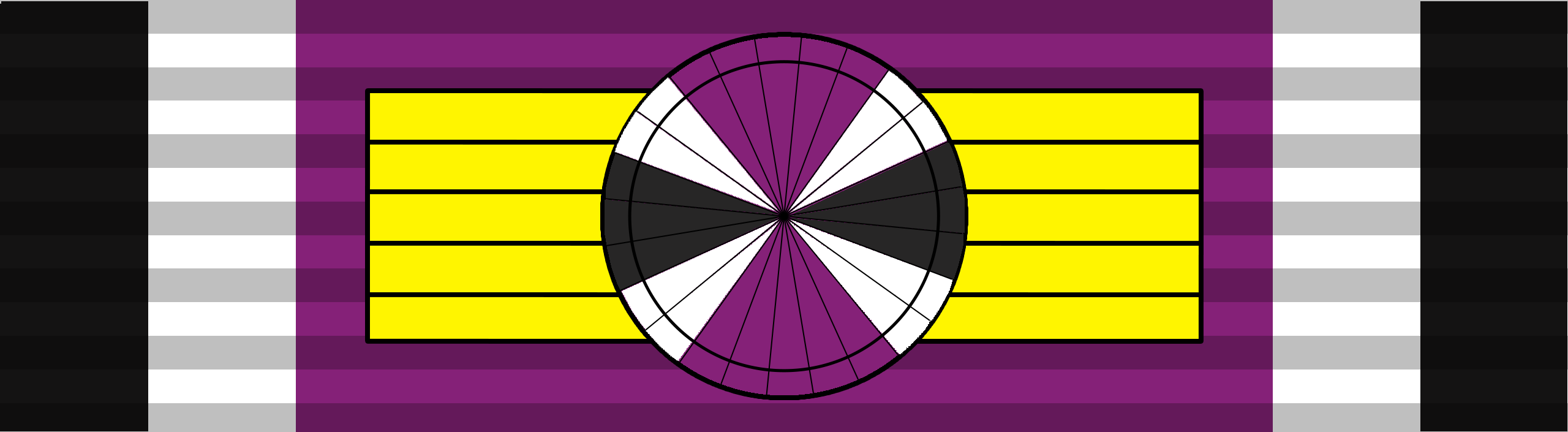
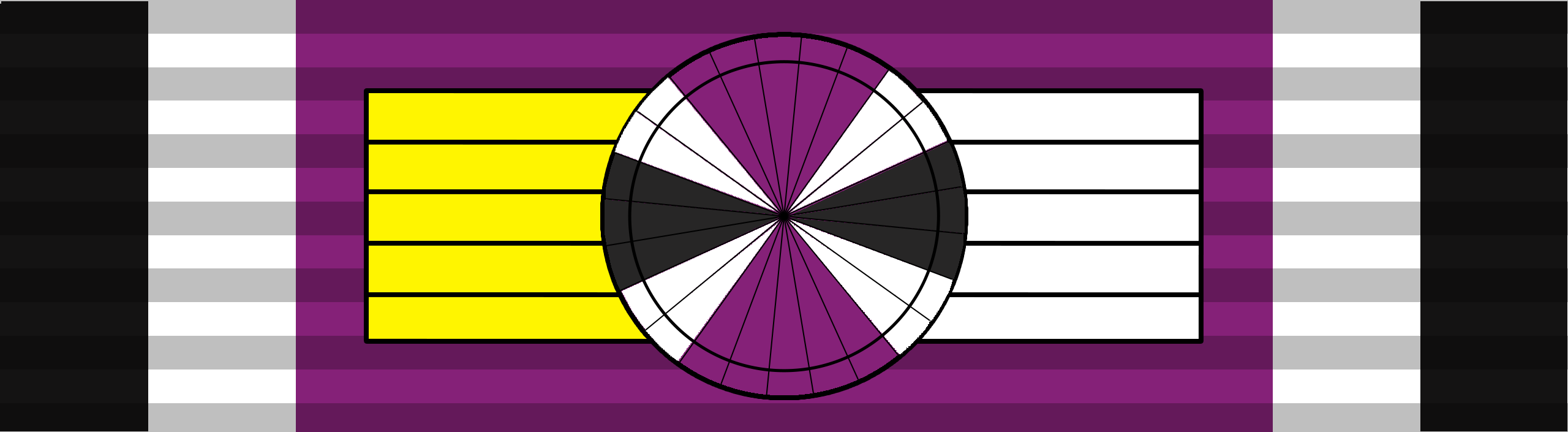
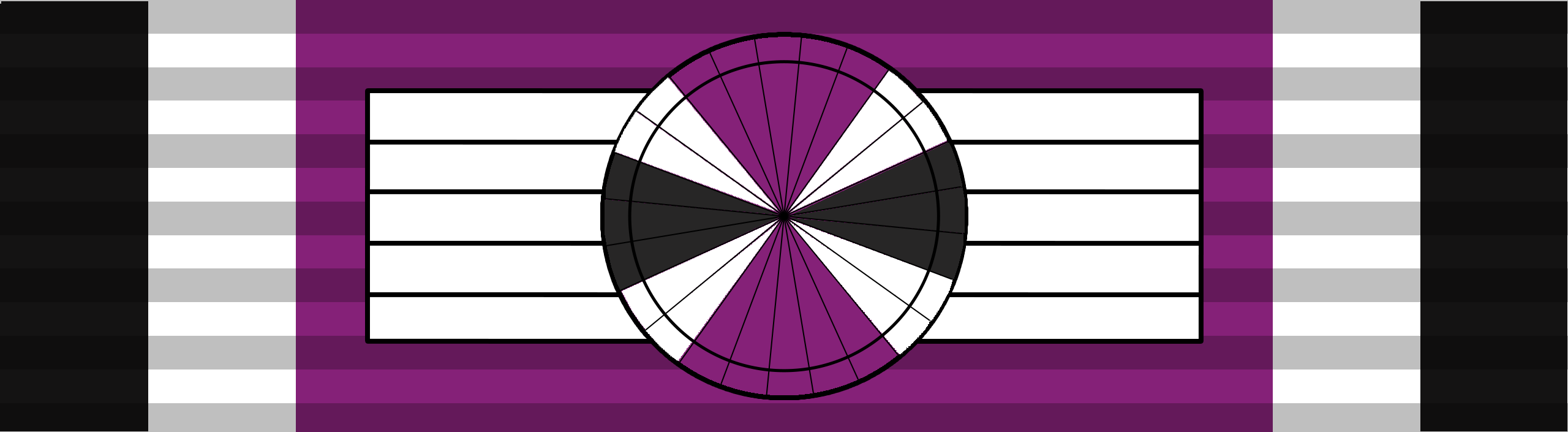
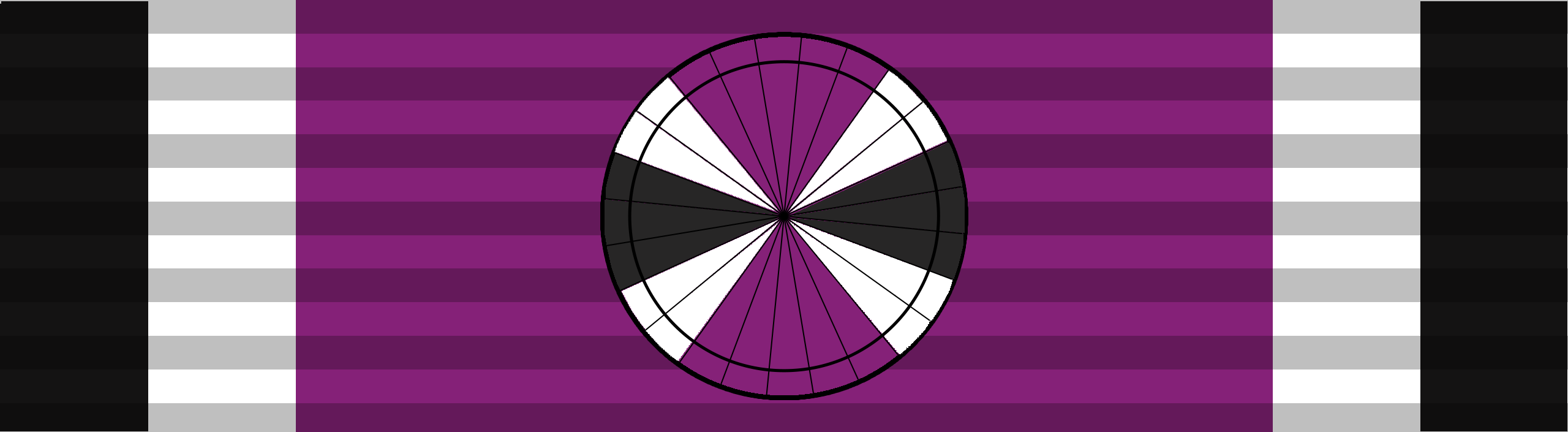
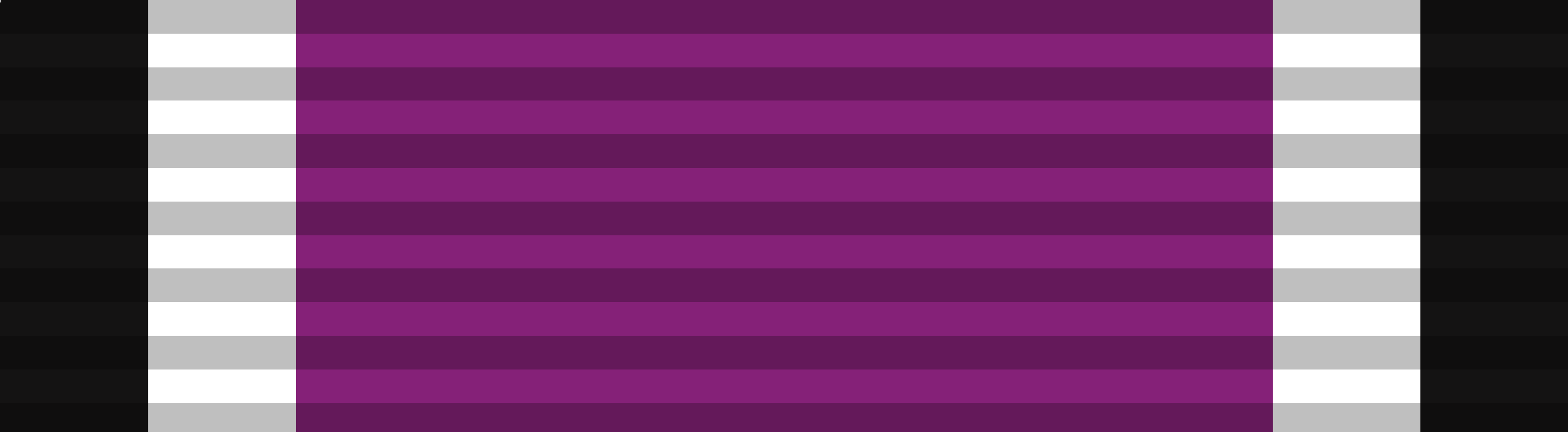
- Grades: Grand Cordon Grand Officer Commander Officer Knight

Precedence
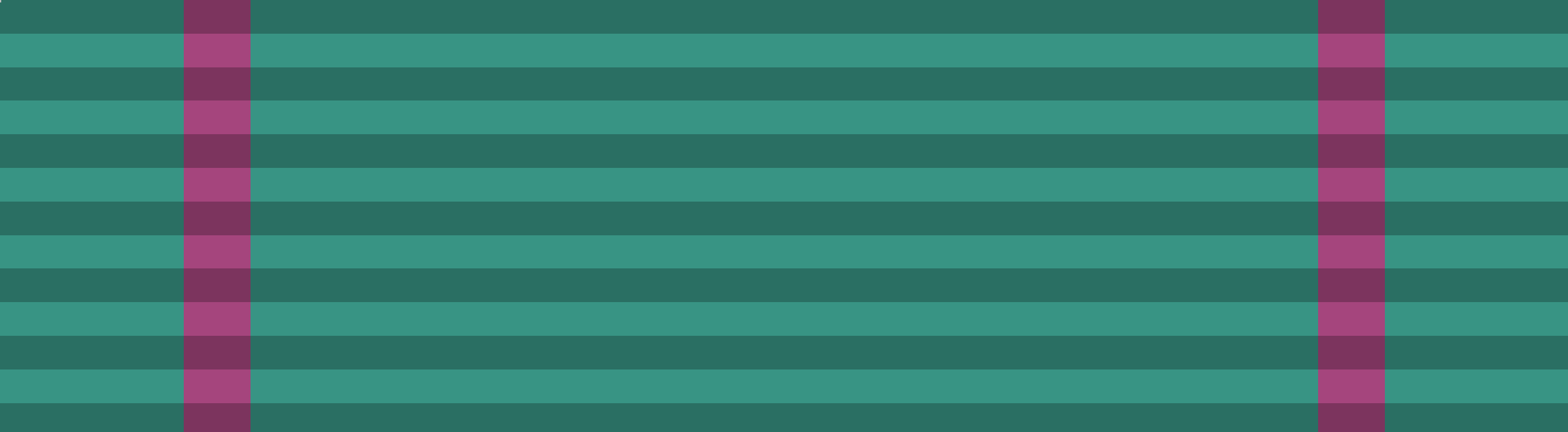
- Next (higher): Order of the Star of Jordan

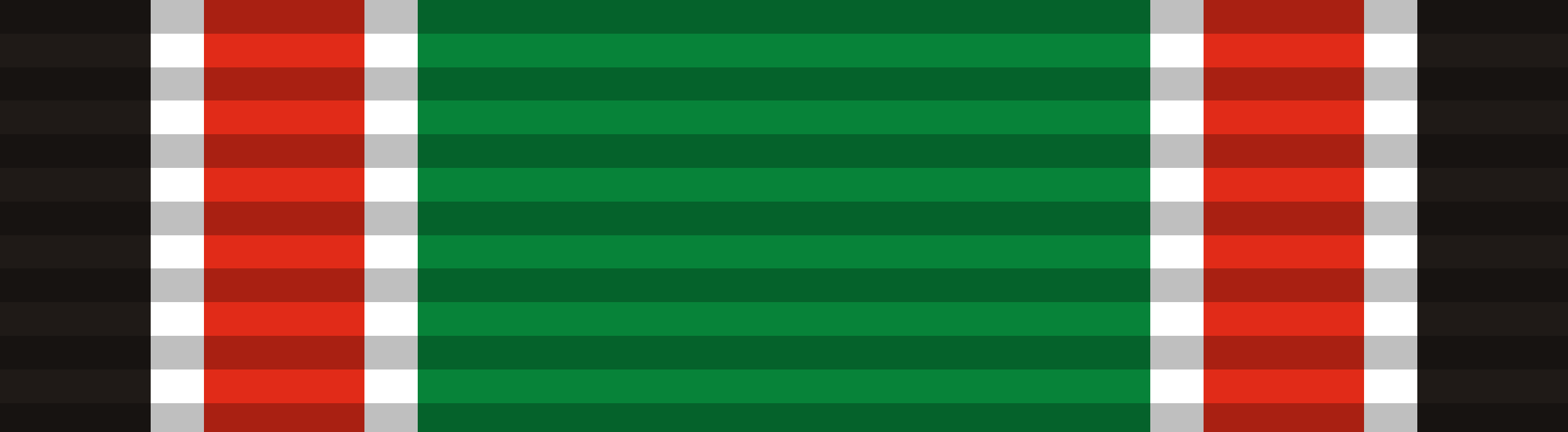
- Next (lower): Order of Military Merit (Jordan)

The Order of Independence (Wisam al-Istiqlal) is the fourth knighthood order of the Kingdom of Jordan.

== History ==
It was instituted in 1921 by Emir Hussein bin Ali, Sharif of Mecca.

== Grades and insignias ==
The ribbon is purple with white and black stripes on its borders.

The order is divided in five classes:

Order of Independence Service Ribbons
Grand Cordon	Grand Officer	Commander	Officer	Knight

== Notable recipients ==
Senior members of the Jordanian Royal Family as well as Prime Ministers of Jordan are among the current recipients of the Order's highest rank of Grand Cordon. Others include foreign royalty, prominent businessmen and cultural figures.

Grand Cordon

- B. J. Habibie, President of Indonesia
- L. B. Moerdani, Commander of the Indonesian National Armed Forces
- Jaime de Marichalar, Infanta Elena, Duchess of Lugo's former husband.
- Simeon II, King of the Bulgarians and Prime Minister.
- Anthony Bailey, interfaith campaigner.
- Waleed bin Ibrahim Al Ibrahim, Saudi businessman and media figure.
- Halbi Mohd Yussof, Minister of Brunei
- Yasmin Umar, Minister of Brunei
- Trad Al-Fayez
- Hashemite University, received the order of Independence of first class.
- Edraak.org, received the order of Independence of first class.
- Amer Khammash
- Bisher Al-Khasawneh
- Majed Al-Hajhassan
- Jan Peter Balkenende (past Dutch Prime Minister)

Grand Officer

- Faisal Al-Fayez, Prime Minister
- Kathleen Kenyon, British archaeologist
- Air Chief Marshal Anwar Shamim (Chief of Air Staff Pakistan Air Force 1978-1986)
- Raja Inal Siregar, Governor of North Sumatra

Commander

- General Zia-ul-Haq (President of Pakistan 1978-88); Awarded for his role in crushing the Palestinian rebels during Black September 1970
- Air Commodore Zafar Masud (Pakistan Air Force); Base Commander, PAF Base Sargodha during the 1965 War
- Amer Al-Fayez

== Sources ==
Medals World Index, Jordan: Order of Independence (Wisam al-Istiqlal)
