= Jordanian Armed Forces =

Combined military forces of Jordan

- القوات المسلحة الأردنية
- Emblem of the Jordanian Armed Forces
- Founded: 22 October 1920; 106 years ago
- Current form: 1 March 1956; 70 years ago
- Service branches: Royal Jordanian Army; Royal Jordanian Air Force; Royal Jordanian Navy
- Headquarters: Amman

Leadership
- Commander-in-chief: Field Marshal King Abdullah II
- Minister of Defence: Jafar Hassan
- Chairman of the Joint Chiefs of Staff: Major General Majdi Harasis

Personnel
- Military age: 18–49 years old
- Active personnel: 114,500
- Reserve personnel: 100,000

Expenditure
- Budget: $5.0B USD
- Percent of GDP: 6.5%

Industry
- Domestic suppliers: Jordan Design and Development Bureau
- Foreign suppliers: Australia; Austria; Brazil; Canada; China; Czech Republic; Finland; France; Germany; Hungary; India; Italy; Japan; South Korea; Netherlands; Poland; Russia; South Africa; Sweden; Switzerland; Spain; Taiwan; Turkey; United Kingdom; United States

Related articles
- History: World War II (1940–45); 1948 Arab–Israeli War; Retribution operations (1950s); The War over Water; Six-Day War; War of Attrition (1967–70); Battle of Karameh (1968); Black September; Yom Kippur War; Yemeni Civil War (1994); 1999 East Timorese crisis First Libyan Civil War; International military intervention against ISIL (2014–present); Saudi-led intervention in Yemen (2015)
- Ranks: Jordanian military ranks

The Jordanian Armed Forces (JAF) (Arabic: القوات المسلحة الأردنية, romanized: Al-Qūwāt Al-Musallaḥah Al-Urduniyya), also referred to as the Arab Army (Arabic: الجيش العربي, Al-Jaysh Al-ʿArabi), are the military forces of the Hashemite Kingdom of Jordan. They consist of the ground forces, air force, and navy. They are under the direct control of the King of Jordan who is the Supreme Commander of the Jordanian Armed Forces and acts by recommendation of the Defence Minister. The current Chairman of the Joint Chiefs of Staff is Major General Majdi Harasis.

The first organized army in Jordan was established on 22 October 1920, and was named the "Mobile Force". At the time it only had 150 men in its ranks. On its third anniversary in 1923, the force was renamed the Arab Legion, consisting of 1,000 men. By the time Jordan became an independent state in 1946, the Arab Legion numbered some 8,000 soldiers in 3 mechanized regiments. In 1956, King Hussein dismissed all British generals and changed the name of the Legion into the "Jordanian Arab Army" in what became known as the Arabization of the Jordanian Army command.

The army fought in several wars and battles, mostly against Israel. In the 1948 Arab–Israeli War, the capture of the West Bank by Jordan and the decisive Battles of Latrun, proved that the Arab Legion was the most effective army during the war. Several confrontations followed with Israel, resulting in mixed success; they included the Retribution operations, the Six-Day War, the War of Attrition and Yom Kippur War. Jordan also had to face the PLO and the Syrian Army during the events of Black September. The signing of the Israel–Jordan peace treaty in 1994 ended the state of belligerency between the two countries.

It is today considered to be among the most professional in the region, and is seen as particularly well-trained, organized, and equipped.

== History ==
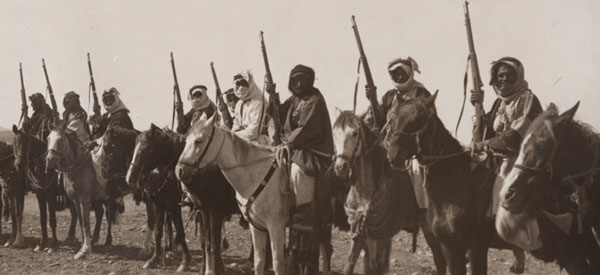
Arab Revolt Tribal Cavalry – Tribes of Jordan and Arabia, c. 1918

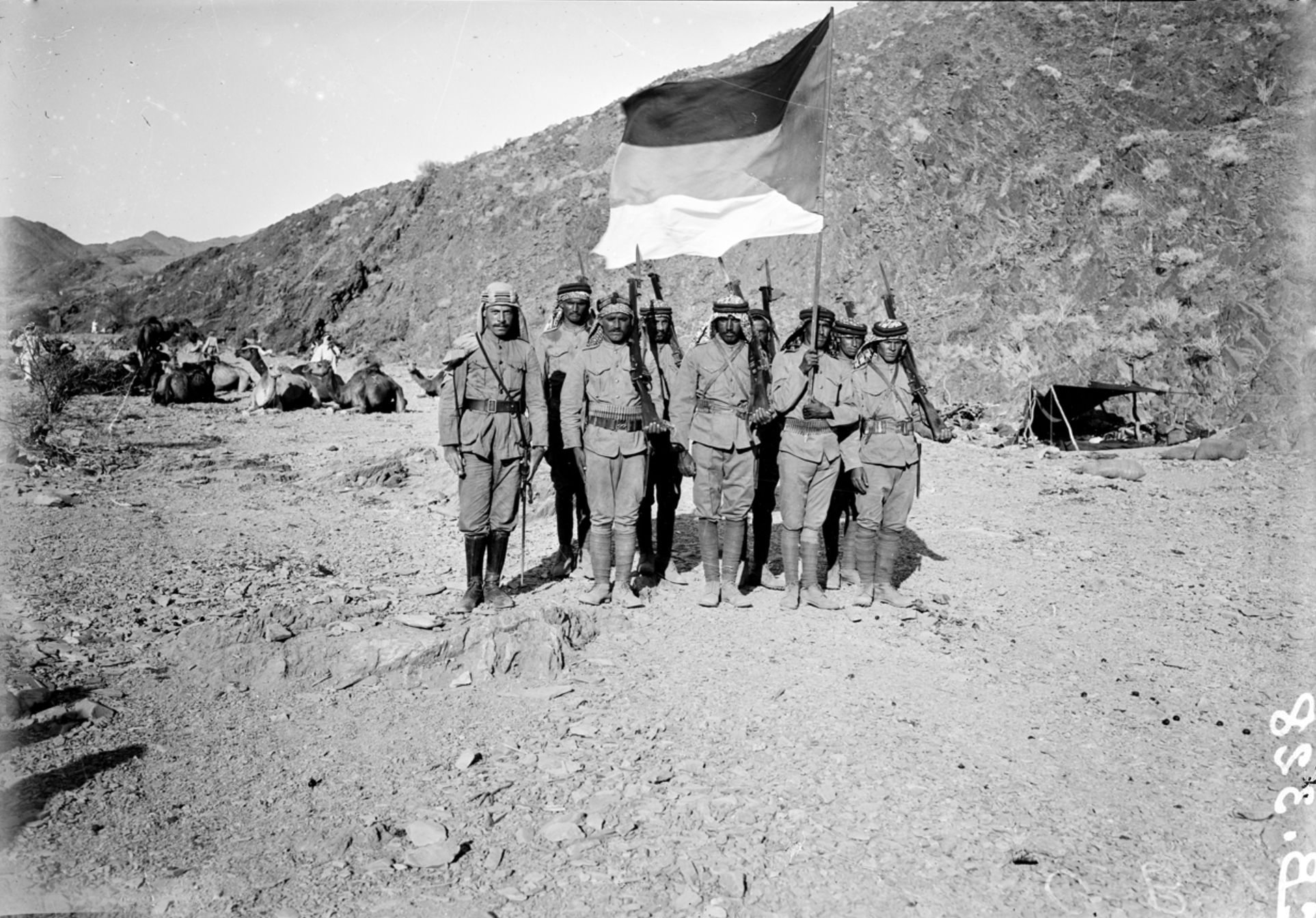
Arab army during the Arab revolt of 1916 against the Ottoman Empire formed the nucleus of the Arab Legion.

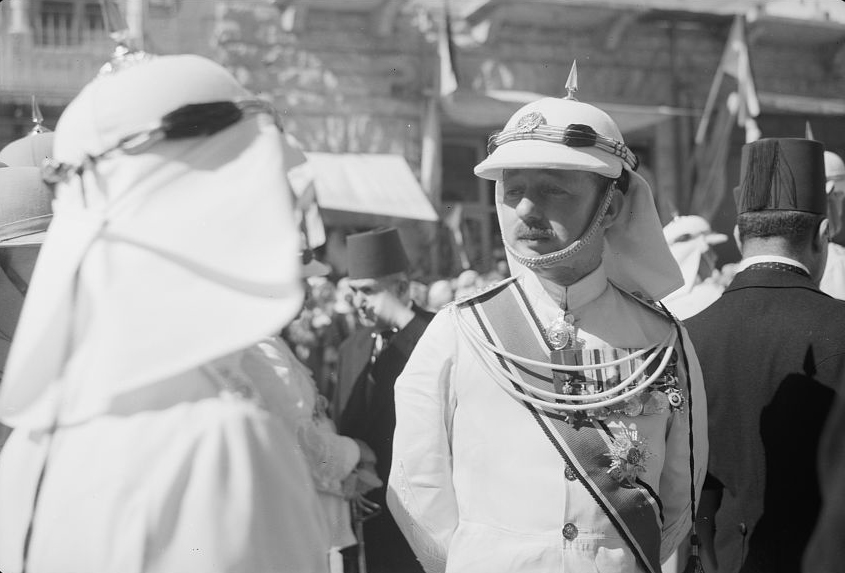
Commander of the Arab Legion, Glubb Pasha in uniform. Amman, September 11, 1940.

The first organized army in Jordan was established on 22 October 1920, and was named the "Mobile Force", at the time it was 150 man strong under the command of the British Captain Frederick Peake. On its third anniversary, in October 1923, the now-1,000-man force was renamed the Arab Legion.

In 1939, John Bagot Glubb, better known as Glubb Pasha, became the Legion's commander, and continued in office until the dismissal of British officers in March 1956. On 1 April 1926, the Transjordan Frontier Force was formed, consisting of only 150 men and most of them were stationed along Transjordan's roads.

In 1956, the Arabization of the Jordanian Army command (Arabic: تعريب قيادة الجيش العربي, Ta'reeb Qiyadat Al-Jaysh Al-Arabi) saw the dismissal of senior British officers commanding the Arab Legion by King Hussein and the subsequent renaming of the Legion into the Jordanian Armed Forces. Glubb Pasha, the Arab Legion's British commander, was replaced with Major General Radi Annab, who became the first Arab commander of the Arab Legion. Hussein's intentions to Arabize the Army command were to replace British officers with Jordanian officers, assert political independence from Britain, and improve relations with neighboring Arab states that viewed the British with suspicion. An annual celebration is held on 1 March in Jordan to mark the historic event.

Timeline of the history and development of the Jordanian Army and the Arab Legion:

1920–1947	Pre-1948 War	1948 War	Battles – 1956	Kuwait – 1963
Sammu Battle – 1966	Six-Day War – 1967	1967–1973	After 1977	2000–present

On 18 August 2025, Brigadier General Mustafa Hiyari announced plans to reintroduce conscription of male youth. The first phase of this will include 6,000 people born in 2007, and turning 18 before 1 January 2021. In February 2026, Jordan reinstated conscription after it had been suspended for more than 30 years.

On the first day of the 2026 Israeli–United States strikes on Iran, the Jordanian army reported that it intercepted 13 ballistic missiles fired from Iran.

== Structure and objectives ==
The army's organisational structure was traditionally based on two armoured divisions and two mechanized divisions. These have been transformed into a lighter, more mobile forces, based largely on a brigade structure and considered better capable of rapid reaction in emergencies. An armoured division has become the core element of a strategic reserve.

The main objectives of the Jordanian Armed Forces are:

1. Protect the Kingdom of Jordan borders from any invasion.
2. Protect the people inside the Kingdom and their rights.
3. Protect the King of Jordan.
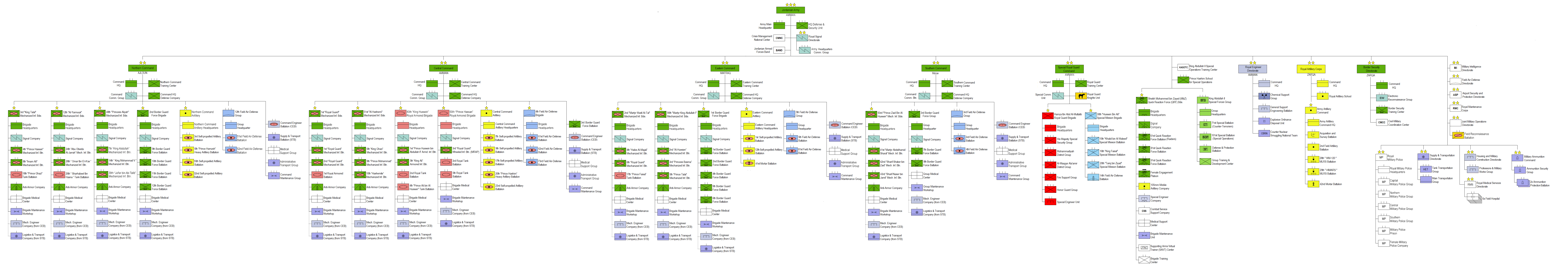
Royal Jordanian Army Order of Battle (OrBat) 2020

=== Special Operations Forces ===
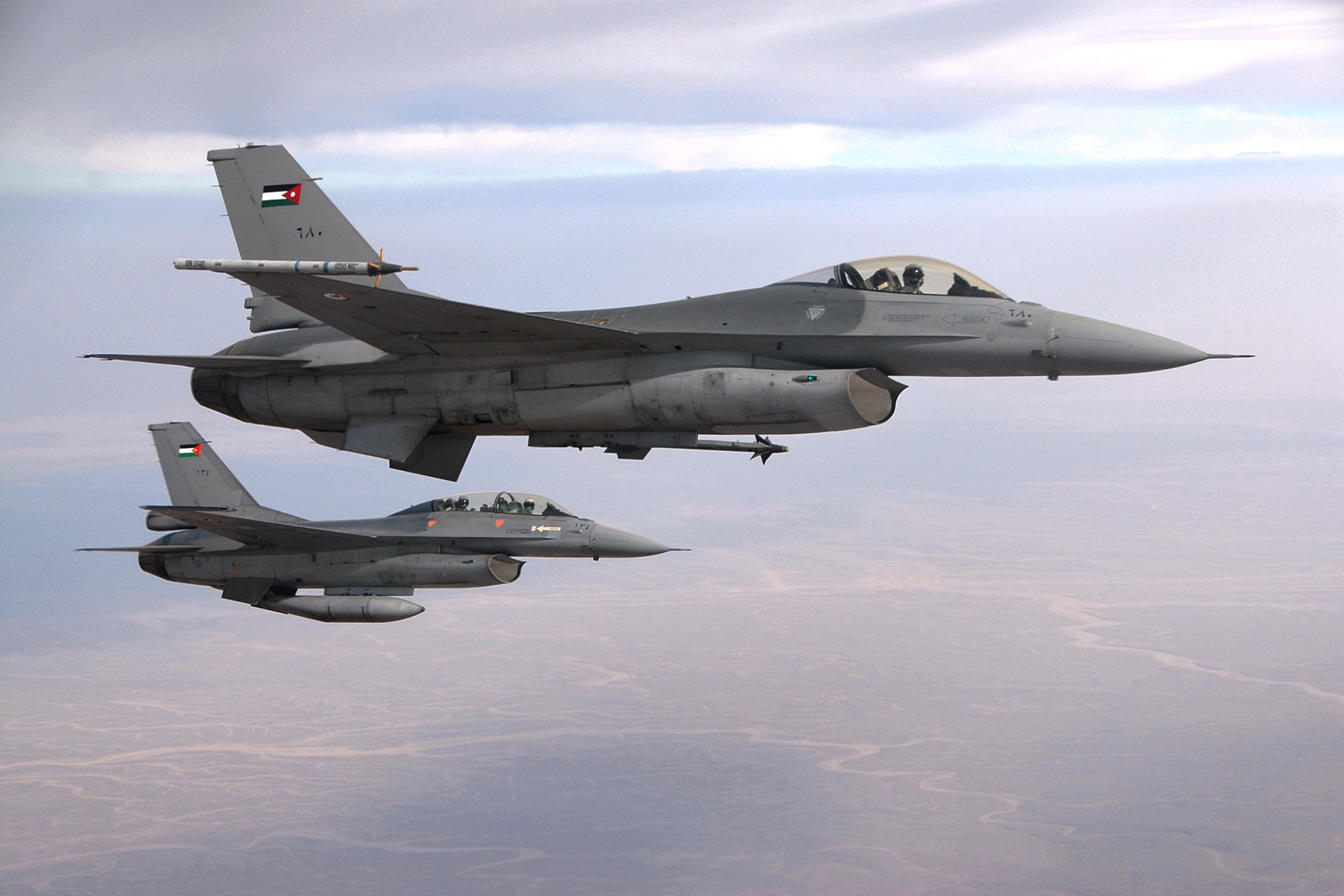
Royal Jordanian Air Force F-16 Fighting Falcon aircraft fly over Jordan, 19 October 2009

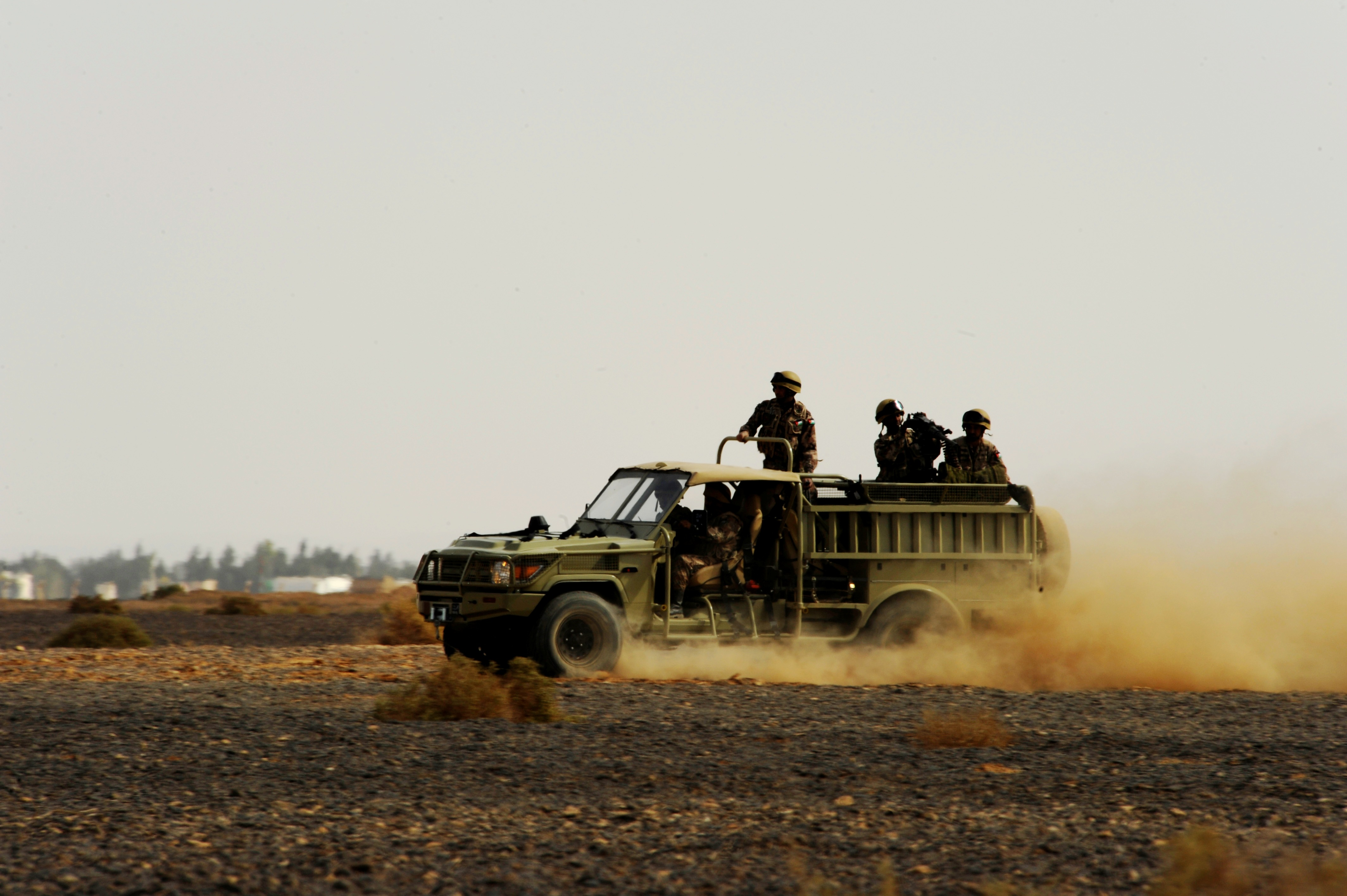
Special Operation Forces at Shaheed Mwaffaq Air Base showing a KADDB manufactured Desert Iris vehicle, November 2010

Founded on 15 April 1963, on the orders of the late King Hussein, its primary roles include reconnaissance, counter-terrorism, search and evacuation, intelligence gathering combat, and the protection of key sites. King Abdullah II Special Forces Group are also charged with carrying out precision strikes against critical enemy targets. The unit is equipped and trained to be able to operate behind enemy lines for long periods without any logistical support, and is considered one of the finest special forces units in the world.

The group is supported by the newly founded Sheikh Mohammed bin Zayed (MbZ) Quick Reaction Force (QRF) Brigade which is a brigade-strength forces with high combat readiness, immediate response speed, flexible and highly mobile that are able to operate independently, within Jordanian forces, or with friendly and allied forces to defend Jordanian national security within the borders of the Kingdom of Jordan or Outside in all circumstances at the time and place and in accordance with the orders of the General Command of the Armed Forces.

== Defense industry ==
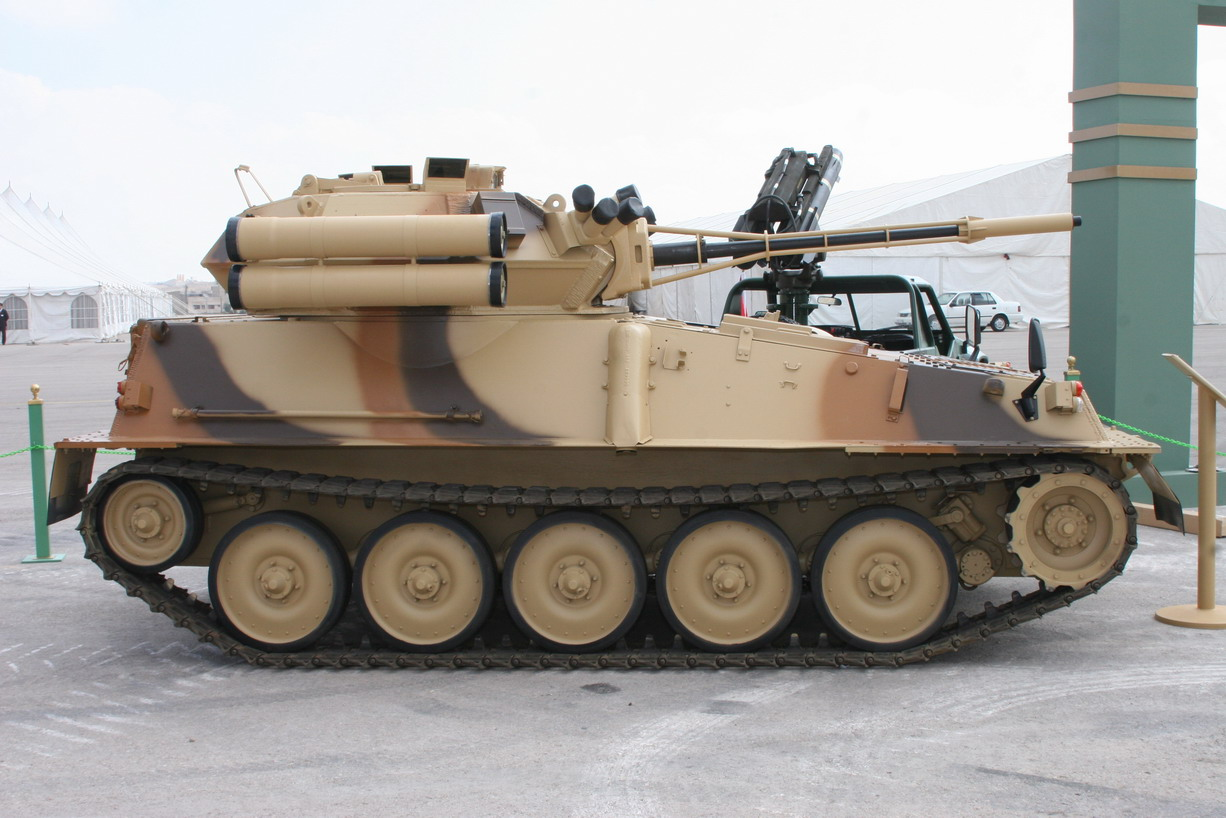
FV107 Scimitar updated by KADDB in display at SOFEX 2006

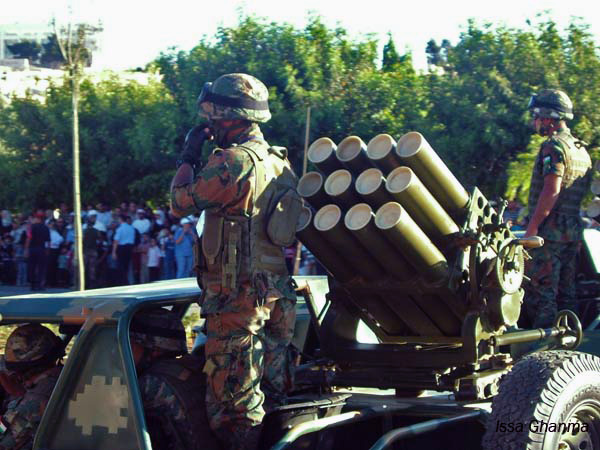
Jordanian troops in a military parade in Amman, June 2007

Jordan is a recent entrant to the domestic defense industry with the establishment of King Abdullah Design and Development Bureau (now Jordan Design and Development Bureau) in 1999. The defense industrial initiative is intended to jumpstart industrialization across a range of sectors. With the Jordanian defense expenditures at 8.7% of GDP, the Jordanian authorities created the defense industry to utilize defense budget spending power and to assist in economic growth without placing additional demands on the national budget. Jordan also hosts SOFEX, the world's fastest growing and region's only special operations and homeland security exhibition and conference. Jordan is a regional and international provider of advanced military goods and services.

A KADDB Industrial Park was opened in September 2009 in Mafraq. It is an integral industrial free zone specialized in defense industries and vehicles and machinery manufacturing. By 2015, the park is expected to provide around 15,000 job opportunities whereas the investment volume is expected to reach JD500 million.

== Peacekeeping ==
The Jordanian Armed Forces has been a strong supporter and participant of UN peacekeeping missions. Jordan ranks among the highest internationally in taking part in UN peacekeeping missions. The size of the Jordanian participation in various areas of the United Nations peacekeeping troops and staff, hospital and international observers, is estimated to be 61,611 officers and men, starting in 1989 in Angola through the task of military observers and humanitarian security forces. After France and the UK, Jordan was the largest contributor of troops to the UN forces in the former Yugoslavia, sending three battalions, or over three thousand troops, from 1993 to 1996.

At the U.N. Copenhagen summit, Jordan was alone, out of more than 30 developing nations, in unveiling plans to help fight climate change, including upgrading its armed forces by 2020, an area usually overlooked in the global warming debate. The army will seek to upgrade engines and old vehicles and use energy saving technologies.

== International assistance ==
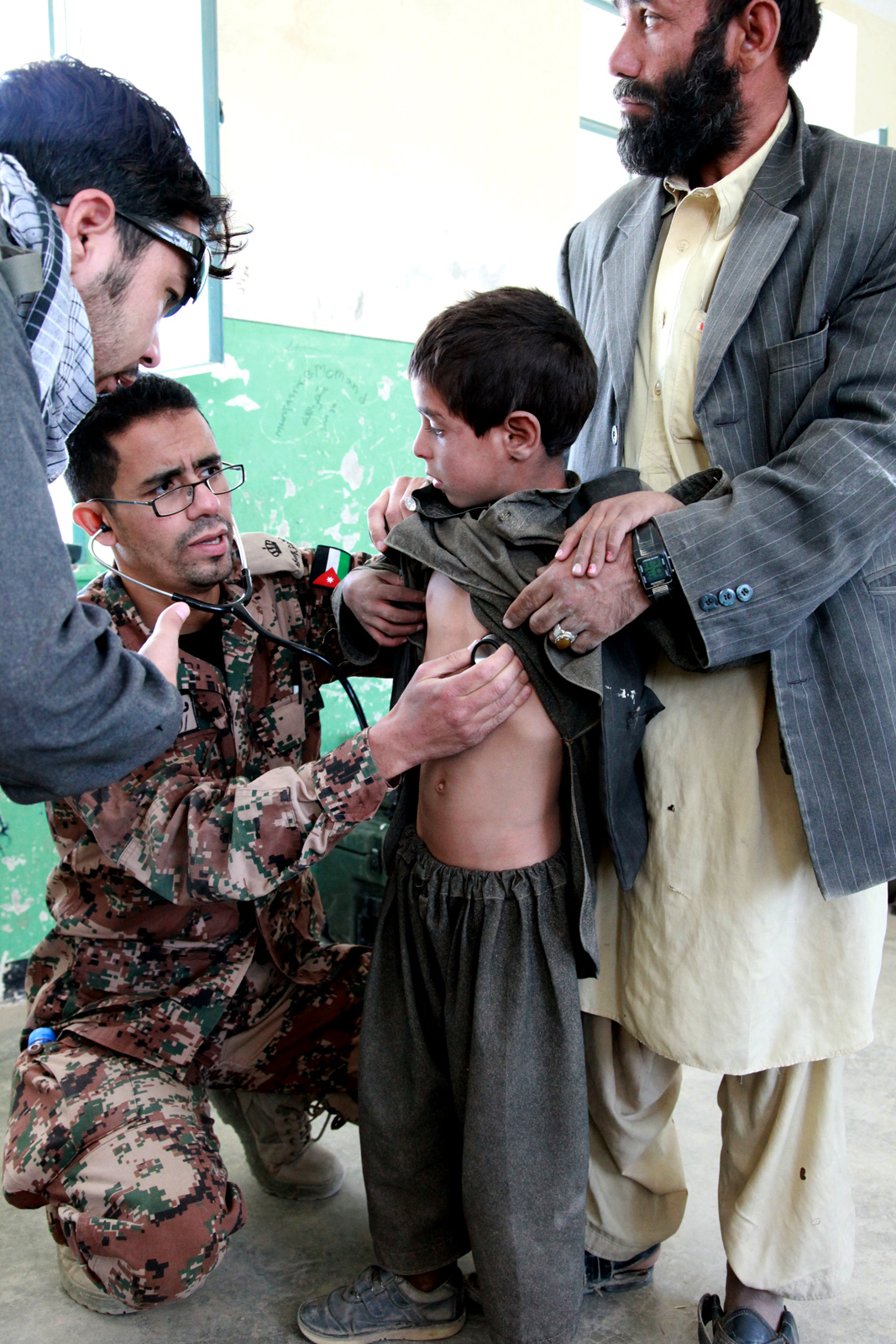
A Jordanian military doctor examines a child in Afghanistan, October 2009.

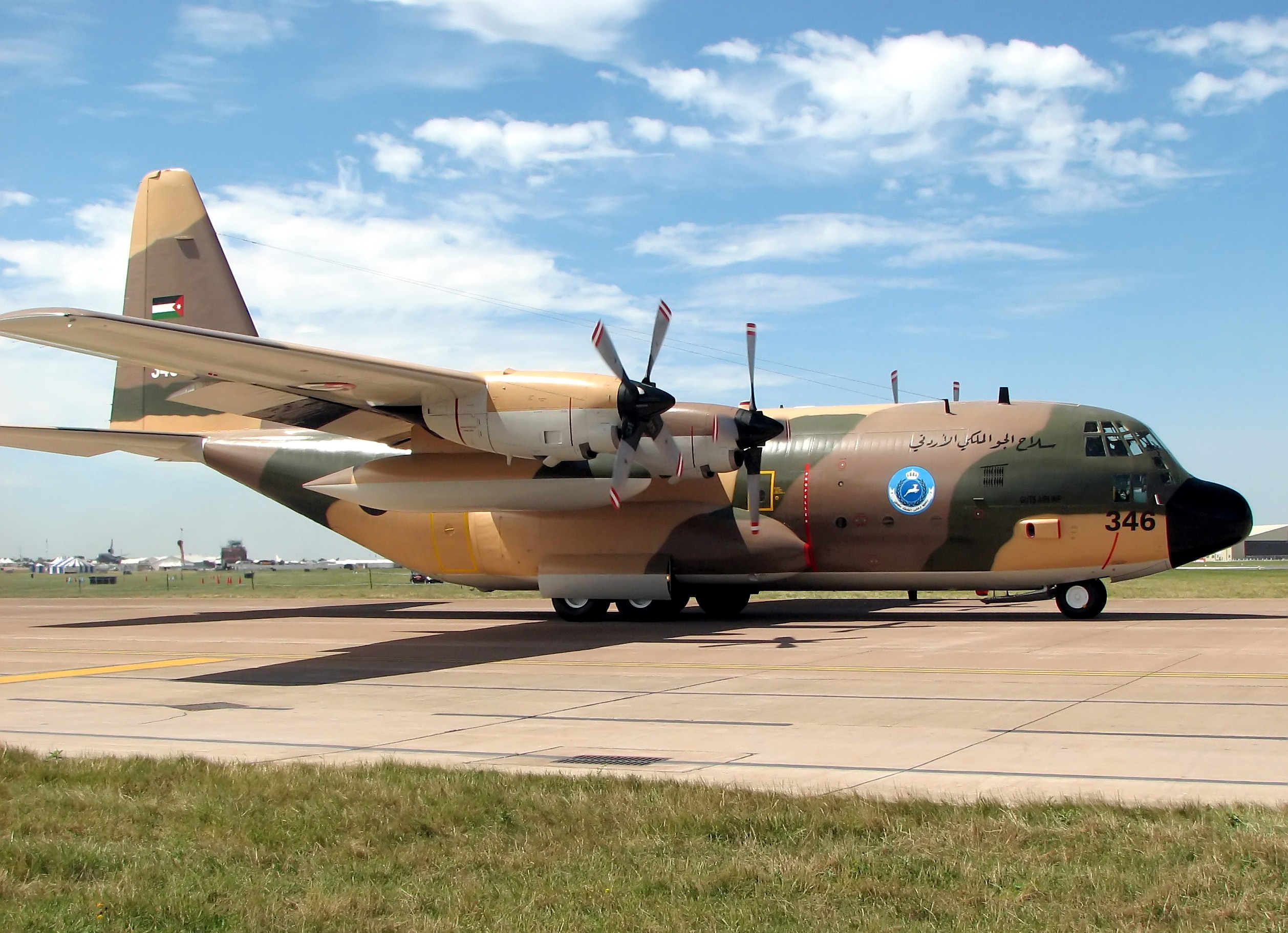
Hercules C-130H of the Royal Jordanian Air Force taxis for takeoff, July 2006.

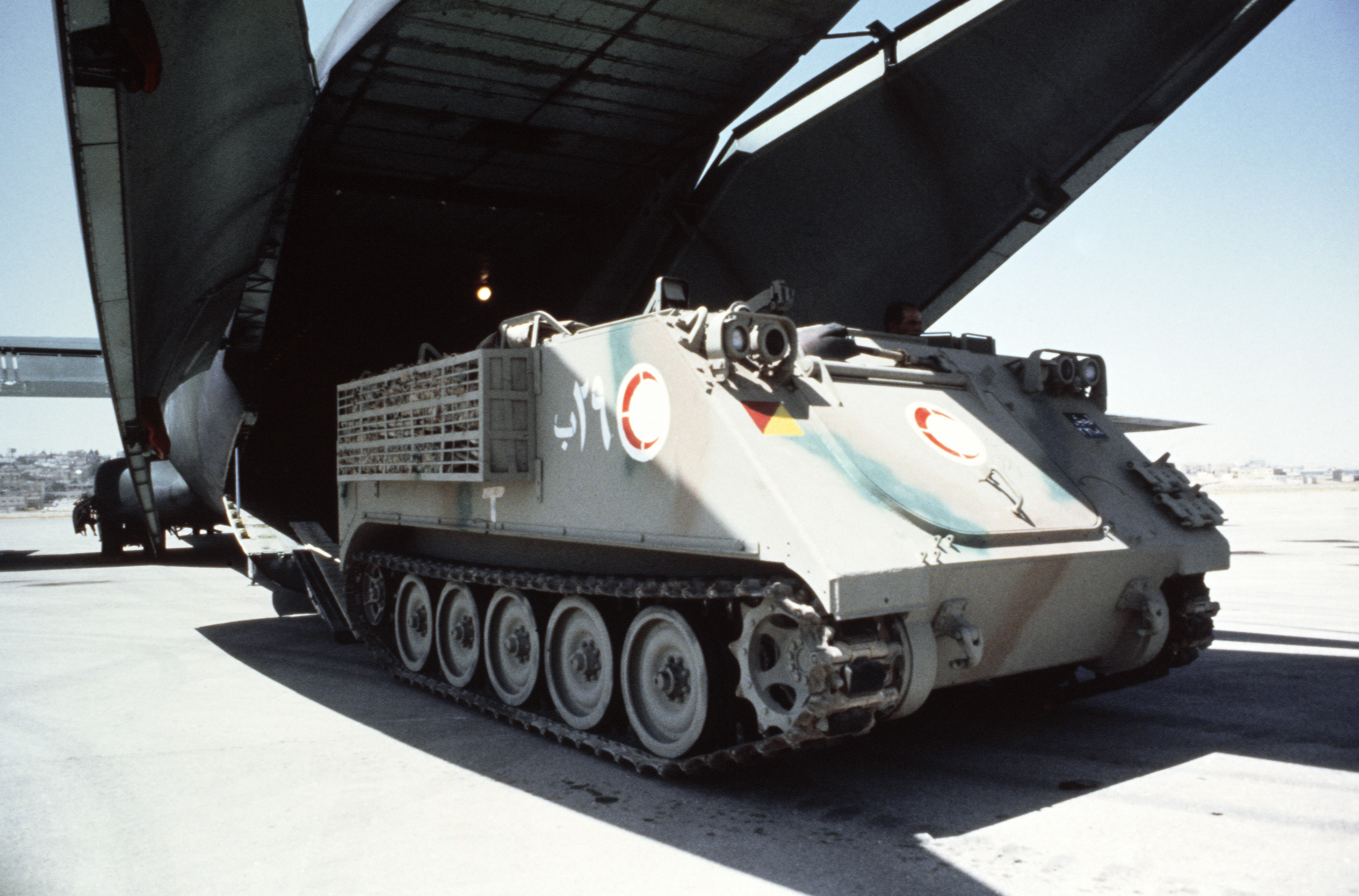
A Jordanian M113 armored ambulance is offloaded at King Hussein Airport, September 1987.

In addition to providing domestic and border security for the country, the Jordanian Armed Forces have assumed a prominent regional and international role as a provider of humanitarian assistance and military training. The Jordanian Armed Forces recently cooperated with Jordan Hashemite Charity Organization to send humanitarian aid including rescue equipment, tents, logistical support, medical supplies, and food to Syria and Turkey following the 2023 Turkey-Syria Earthquake.

=== Medical services ===
Jordan has dispatched several field hospitals to conflict zones and areas affected by natural disasters across the world such as Iraq, the West Bank, Lebanon, Afghanistan, Haiti, Indonesia, Congo, Liberia, Ethiopia, Eritrea, Sierra Leone, and Pakistan. The Kingdom's field hospitals have extended aid to some one million people in the West Bank and 55,000 in Lebanon.

On 24 November 2010, another Jordanian military field hospital (Gaza 11) arrived in the coastal territory of Gaza to replace (Gaza 10) whose tour of duty came to an end after treating 44,000 Palestinians and performing 720 minor and major surgeries since its inception in September 2010.

=== Police and military training ===
The Jordanians have helped Iraqis by providing them with military and police training as well as donating military and police equipment. The armed forces trained tens of thousands of Iraqi troops and policemen after the U.S.-led invasion.

Jordan has also begun training Libyan policemen as part of a programme to strengthen ties between the countries. The training programme is part of a wider plan to re-integrate 200,000 former rebel fighters into Libyan society.

== Actions against drug smuggling ==
=== Technological & strategic measures ===
The Jordanian military has shot down multiple drug-laden drones (including a June 2023 and July 2023 incidents), demonstrating active airspace enforcement. It has also committed proactive airstrikes inside southern Syria that have targeted drug labs and trafficking networks since 2023, supported by intelligence and military coordination.

=== Bilateral and regional cooperation ===
On 7 January 2025, Jordan and Syria formalized the creation of a joint security committee aimed at combating the escalating threats of arms trafficking, drug smuggling, and the resurgence of Islamic State-affiliated groups along their porous border. This initiative marked a significant step toward renewed bilateral cooperation after years of strained relations and mutual distrust. The committee's mandate includes intelligence sharing, coordinated border patrols, and dismantling smuggling networks that have turned southern Syria into a hub for narcotics, particularly Captagon, destined for Jordan and beyond. Reinforcing this collaborative momentum, Syria's transitional leader, Ahmed al‑Sharaa, visited Amman in February 2025, where he publicly reaffirmed his government's commitment to eradicating drug trafficking and stabilizing the border region. His visit underscored a strategic alignment between the two neighbors to confront both organized crime and extremist threats, while signaling a tentative thaw in diplomatic engagement centered on shared security concerns.

=== Key interceptions & clashes ===
7 February 2024

A deadly clash along the border resulted in three smuggler fatalities and one Jordanian guard wounded. Authorities reported that pro-Iranian networks are increasingly involved in trafficking.

7 December 2024

Jordanian forces in the East and South Military Zones foiled major narcotics smuggling attempts one involving a drone-carried load and another via ground infiltration forcing smugglers to retreat and securing the seized drugs.

March 2025

Border forces clashed with heavily armed smugglers attempting to infiltrate from Syria, resulting in the deaths of four traffickers. Jordanian forces seized drugs and weapons during the operation.
