= Military ranks of Jordan =

The military ranks of Jordan are the military insignia used by the Jordanian Armed Forces. Jordan shares a rank structure similar to that of the United Kingdom.

== Commissioned officer ranks ==
The rank insignia of commissioned officers.

Rank group	General / flag officers					Senior officers			Junior officers
Royal Jordanian Army
Royal Jordanian Army	مشیر; Mushir	فريق أول; Fariq 'awal	فريق; Fariq	لواء; Liwa	عميد; Amid	عقيد; Aqid	مقدم; Muqaddam	رائد; Ra'id	نقيب; Naqib	ملازم أول; Mulazim awwal	ملازم; Mulazim
Royal Jordanian Navy
Royal Jordanian Navy	مشیر; Mushir	فريق أول; Fariq 'awal	فريق; Fariq	لواء; Liwa	عميد; Amid	عقيد; Aqid	مقدم; Muqaddam	رائد; Ra'id	نقيب; Naqib	ملازم أول; Mulazim awwal	ملازم; Mulazim
Royal Jordanian Air Force
Royal Jordanian Air Force	مشیر; Mushir	فريق أول; Fariq 'awal	فريق; Fariq	لواء; Liwa	عميد; Amid	عقيد; Aqid	مقدم; Muqaddam	رائد; Ra'id	نقيب; Naqib	ملازم أول; Mulazim awwal	ملازم; Mulazim
Rank group	General / flag officers					Senior officers			Junior officers

== Other ranks ==
The rank insignia of non-commissioned officers and enlisted personnel.

Rank group	Senior NCOs				Junior NCOs	Enlisted
Royal Jordanian Army							No insignia
Royal Jordanian Army	وكيل أول; Wakil 'awal	وكيل; Wakil	رقيب أول; Raqib 'awal	رقیب; Raqib	عريف; Earif	جندي أول; Jundiun awwal	جندي; Jundiun
Royal Jordanian Navy							No insignia
Royal Jordanian Navy	وكيل أول; Wakil 'awal	وكيل; Wakil	رقيب أول; Raqib 'awal	رقیب; Raqib	عريف; Earif	جندي أول; Jundiun awwal	جندي; Jundiun
Royal Jordanian Air Force							No insignia
Royal Jordanian Air Force	وكيل أول; Wakil 'awal	وكيل; Wakil	رقيب أول; Raqib 'awal	رقیب; Raqib	عريف; Earif	جندي أول; Jundiun awwal	جندي; Jundiun
Rank group	Senior NCOs				Junior NCOs	Enlisted
