= List of recipients of the Legion of Merit =

List of recipients of the US Legion of Merit

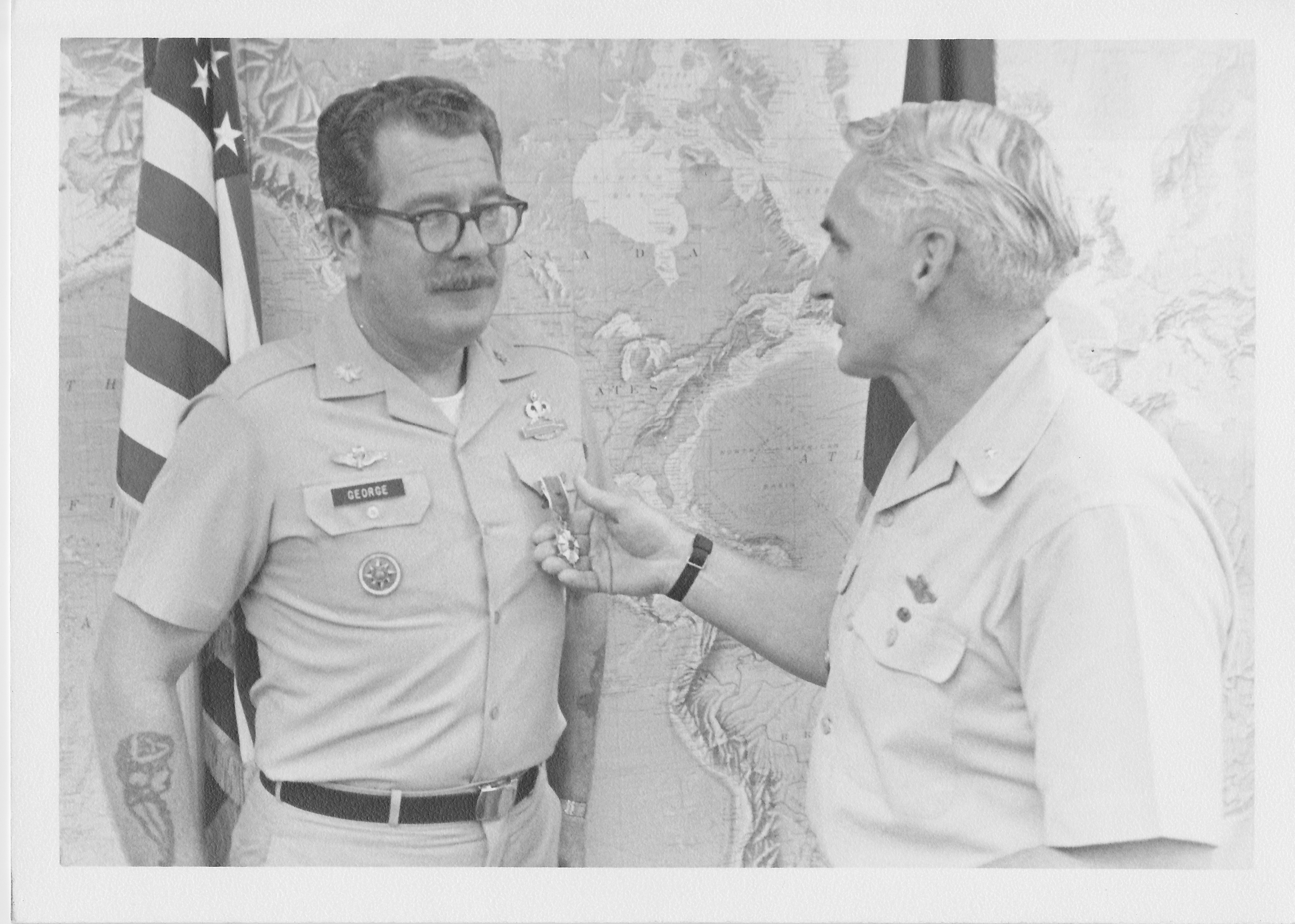
R. L. George awarded the Legion of Merit by General William Westmoreland

The Legion of Merit is a decoration of the United States and is awarded to foreign military personnel in four grades and to U.S. military personnel without distinction of degree. The following are notable recipients within the award.

== Chief Commander ==
#	Nationality	Office/Position	Rank	Name	Force	Date	Comments
1.	UK		Lieutenant-general	Sir Kenneth Anderson, KCB, MC	British Armed Forces	June 18, 1943	
2.	Republic of China	Chairman	Generalissimo	Chiang Kai-shek	Chinese Armed Forces	July 1943	
3.	Republic of China	Commander of the 200th Division of the National Revolutionary Army	Lieutenant-general	Tai An-lan (Dai Anlan)	Chinese Armed Forces	1943	In command of 200th Division, Chinese Expeditionary Force (Burma). KIA on May 26, 1942, in Burma.
4.	UK	GOC-in-C, Eighth Army	General	Sir Bernard Montgomery, KCB, DSO	British Armed Forces	August 6, 1943	Later Field Marshal
5.	UK	Air C-in-C Mediterranean Air Command	Air Chief Marshal	Sir Arthur Tedder, GCB	Royal Air Force	August 27, 1943	
6.	USSR	Chief of the Air Force of the Red Army	Chief Marshal Of Aviation	Alexander Alexandrovich Novikov	Soviet Air Forces	June 22, 1944	
7.	USSR	Chief of the General Staff	Marshal of the Soviet Union	Aleksandr Vasilevsky	Soviet Army	1944	
8.	UK	Rear Admiral Commanding HM Australian Squadron	Rear-admiral	Sir Victor Crutchley, VC, KCB, DSC	Royal Australian Naval Squadron	September 1944	For exceptionally meritorious conduct 1942–44 in command of Task Force 44 in the Pacific.
9.	UK	Air Officer Commanding-in-Chief Bomber Command	Air Marshal	Arthur Harris, OBE, AFC	Royal Air Force	October 17, 1944	Known as "Bomber" Harris; he was the only major British commander who refused to receive a peerage after World War II (in protest in support of his men). He instituted "area bombing" of German cities.
10.	UK	King	Commander-in-Chief (Admiral of the Fleet, Field Marshal, Marshal of the Royal Air Force)	George VI	British Armed Forces	1945	
11.	UK	First Sea Lord	Admiral of the Fleet	The 1st Baron Cunningham of Hyndhope, Bt, KT, GCB, DSO**	Royal Navy		
12.	UK		Admiral	Sir John Cunningham, KCB, MVO	Royal Navy		For gallant and distinguished service during the invasion operations in Northern Italy and the South of France.
13.	UK		Acting air marshal	Sir Arthur Coningham, KCB, KBE, DSO, MC, DFC, AFC	Royal Air Force		
14.	Romania	King	Supreme Commander-in-Chief; Marshal of Romania	King Michael I	Romanian Armed Forces	1945	"Rendered exceptionally meritorious conduct in the performance of outstanding service to the cause of the Allied Nations in the struggle against Hitlerite Germany. In July and August, 1944, his Nation, under the dominance of a dictatorial regime over which the King had no control, have allied herself with the Germany aggressors, he, King Mihai I, succeeded in giving purpose, direction and inspiration to the theretofore uncoordinated internal forces of opposition to the ruling dictator. In culmination of his efforts, on 23 August 1944, although his capitol was still dominated by Germany troops, he personally, on his own initiative, and in complete disregard for his own safety, gave the signal for a coup d'etat by ordering his palace guards to arrest the dictator and his chief ministers."
15.	Poland	Commander-in-Chief Polish Armed Forces in the East	Marshal	Michał Rola-Żymierski	Polish Armed Forces	1945	
16.	USSR	Military Governor of the Soviet Occupation Zone of Germany	Marshal of the Soviet Union	Georgy Zhukov	Soviet Army	1945	
17.	UK	Naval Commander-in-Chief of the Allied Naval Expeditionary Force	Admiral	Sir Bertram Ramsay, KCB, KBE, MVO	Royal Navy	January 15, 1945	For gallant and distinguished service whilst in command of the invasion operations on Normandy.
18.	Iraq	Crown Prince	Commander-In-Chief	'Abd al-Ilah	Iraqi Armed Forces	June 1, 1945	
19.	UK	Flag Officer Commanding, 1st Aircraft Carrier Squadron, British Pacific Fleet and Second in Command, British Pacific Fleet	Vice Admiral	Sir Philip Vian, KCB, KBE, DSO**	Royal Navy	July 17, 1945	
20.	France	Chairman of the Provisional Government of the French Republic	Brigadier general	Charles de Gaulle	French Armed Forces	August 24, 1945	
21.	UK	Commander-in-Chief British Air Forces of Occupation	Air Chief Marshal	Sir William Douglas, KCB, MC, DFC	Royal Air Force	August 28, 1945	made commander of the Legion 28 July 1944
22.	UK	Flag Officer, Liaison to the United States Navy in Europe	Vice Admiral	Sir Geoffrey Blake, KCB, DSO	Royal Navy	November 6, 1945	
23.	Norway	Crown Prince	Chief of Defence of Norway	Crown Prince Olav	Norwegian Armed Forces	November 23, 1945	"exceptionally meritorious conduct in the performance of outstanding services from August 1944 to July 1945."
24.	USSR	Commander, Transbaikal-Amur Military District	Marshal of the Soviet Union	Rodion Malinovsky	Soviet Army	1946	
25.	USSR	Commander, Northern Group of Forces	Marshal of the Soviet Union	Konstantin Rokossovsky	Soviet Army	1946	
26.	Nepal	Commanding General	Commanding General	Sir Baber Shamsher Jang Bahadur Rana, GBE, KCSI, KCIE	Nepali Army	1946	Brother of Prime Minister Mohan Shamsher Jang Bahadur Rana who was decorated in 1948.
28.	Saudi Arabia	King	Commander-in-Chief	Abdulaziz bin Abdul Rahman Al Saud	Armed Forces of Saudi Arabia	February 18, 1947	
29.	Mexico	President	Commander-in-Chief	Miguel Alemán Valdés	Mexican Armed Forces	November 26, 1947	
30.	Brazil	President	General (Commander-in-Chief)	Eurico Gaspar Dutra	Brazilian Armed Forces	October 7, 1947	
31.	Iran	Shahanshah	Commander-in-Chief	Mohammad Reza Pahlavi	Iranian Armed Forces	November 26, 1947	
32.	Portugal	Minister of War		Fernando Santos Costa	Portuguese Armed Forces	March 11, 1948	
33.	Kingdom of Yugoslavia	Minister of the Army, Navy and Air Force	General	Dragoljub Mihailović	Yugoslav Royal Army	March 29, 1948	"General Mihailovich and his forces, although lacking adequate supplies, and fighting under extreme hardships, contributed materially to the allied cause, and were instrumental in obtaining a final Allied Victory." Recommended by Dwight D. Eisenhower. The award was kept secret until 1966.
34.	UK		Field Marshal	Sir William Slim, GBE, KCB, DSO, MC	British Armed Forces	1948	
35.	Italy	Chief of Army Staff	General	Luigi Efisio Marras	Italian Army	January 4, 1949	
36.	Nepal	Maharaja, Prime Minister	Commander-in-Chief (Field Marshal)	Mohan Shamsher Jang Bahadur Rana, GBE, GCIE	Royal Nepalese Army	April 14, 1949	Brother of Sir Baber Shamsher Jang Bahadur Rana who was decorated in 1946.
37.	Venezuela	President	Commander-in-Chief	Rómulo Gallegos	Venezuelan Armed Forces	April 14, 1949	
38.	Cuba	President	Commander-in-Chief	Carlos Prío Socarrás	Cuban Armed Forces	April 14, 1949	
39.	India	Chief of the Army Staff and commander-in-chief	General	Kodandera Madappa Cariappa, OBE	Indian Army	November 10, 1949	Later field marshal
40.	France	Chief of the Army Staff	Army General	Georges Revers	French Army	December 30, 1949	
41.	Greece	Commander-in-Chief of the Hellenic Armed Forces	Field Marshal	Alexandros Papagos	Greek Armed Forces	December 30, 1949	
42.	Greece	Chief of the General Staff	General	Dimitrios Yiadzis	Greek Army	December 30, 1949	
43.	Argentina	Minister of National Defense	Divisional General	Humberto Sosa Molina	Armed Forces of the Argentine Republic	May 24, 1950	
44.	Mexico	Secretary of National Defense	Lieutenant General	Gilberto Limón	Mexican Armed Forces	February 14, 1951	
45.	France	President	Commander-in-Chief	Vincent Auriol	French Armed Forces	April 4, 1951	
46.	Ethiopia	Emperor	Commander-in-Chief	Haile Selassie	Ethiopian Armed Forces	August 9, 1951	
47.	Ecuador	President	Commander-in-Chief	Galo Plaza	Ecuadorian Armed Forces	September 25, 1951	
48.	Costa Rica	President	N/A	Otilio Ulate Blanco	N/A	October 24, 1951	
49.	Australia	C-in-C British Commonwealth Forces Korea	Lieutenant-General	Sir Horace Robertson, KBE, DSO	Australian Defence Force	January 15, 1952	
50.	Portugal	Chief of the General Staff of the Armed Forces	General	Aníbal César Valdez de Passos e Sousa	Portuguese Armed Forces	March 13, 1952	
51.	Netherlands	Queen	Commander-in-chief	Queen Juliana I of the Netherlands	Netherlands Armed Forces	April 23, 1952	Was commander-in-chief of the Netherlands Armed Forces; Invested with the Order “For exceptionally meritorious conduct in the performance of outstanding services to the Government of the United States from 1948 to 1952”.
52.	Australia	Prime Minister		The Rt Hon Robert Menzies, KC	Commonwealth of Australia	May 29, 1952	
53.	France		Marshal of France	Jean de Lattre de Tassigny	French Armed Forces	August 6, 1952	Posthumous.
54.	Brazil		Major General	Cyro Espirito Santo Cardoso	Brazilian Army	October 4, 1952	
55.	Iraq	King	Commander-In-Chief	Faisal II of Iraq	Iraqi Armed Forces	November 28, 1952	
56.	Peru	President	Commander-In-Chief	Manuel Odria	Peruvian Armed Forces	August 4, 1953	
57.	Greece	King	Commander-in-Chief	King Paul I	Greek Armed Forces	November 3, 1953	
58.	Pakistan	Commander-in-Chief, Pakistan Army	General	Ayub Khan	Pakistan Army	November 3, 1953	
59.	Turkey	President	Commander-in-Chief	Celâl Bayar	Turkish Armed Forces	March 8, 1954	
60.	Venezuela	President	Commander-in-Chief	Marcos Pérez Jiménez	Venezuelan Army	November 12, 1954	
61.	Thailand	Minister of Defence	Field Marshal	Luang Plaek Pibulsonggram	Royal Thai Army	May 2, 1955	Supreme Commander
62.	India	Chief of the Army Staff	General	Satyawant Mallana Srinagesh	Indian Army	September 2, 1955	Chief of the Army Staff
63.	Thailand	King	Commander-in-Chief	Bhumibol Adulyadej (Rama IX)	Royal Thai Armed Forces	June 28, 1960	Head of the Royal Thai Armed Forces
64.	Libya	Chief of the Army Staff	Major General	Senussi Letaiwish	Royal Libyan Army	June 5, 1961	The President of the United States of America, authorized by Act of Congress, 20 July 1942, takes pleasure in presenting the Legion of Merit, in the Degree of Commander to Major General Senussi Letaiwish, Libyan Army, "for exceptionally meritorious conduct in the performance of outstanding services to the Government of the United States", from October 1958 to June 1961.
65.	Thailand	Chief of Defence Forces	Field Marshal	Thanom Kittikachorn	Royal Thai Army	1967	
66.	South Korea		General	Kim Yong-Bae	Republic of Korea Armed Forces	February 14, 1968	For service April 1965 to March 1966. The initial award of commander degree was revoked and replaced with chief commander.
67.	South Korea	Minister of National Defense		Kim Sung-Eun	Republic of Korea Armed Forces	December 9, 1968	For service March 1963 to June 1966.
68.	Turkey	President	Commander-in-Chief	Kenan Evren	Turkish Armed Forces	June 27, 1988	
69.	UK	Commander British Forces Middle East	General	Sir Peter de la Billière, KCB, KBE, DSO, MC*	British Armed Forces	8 June 1993	
70.	Colombia	Chief of Staff	General	Freddy Padilla de Leon	Colombian Armed Forces	2008	After leading the Operation Jaque into success.
71.	Kuwait	Emir	Commander-in-Chief	Sabah Al-Ahmad Al-Jaber Al-Sabah	Kuwait Military Forces	September 18, 2020	
72.	India	Prime Minister		Narendra Modi	India	December 21, 2020	"President Donald Trump presented the Legion of Merit to Indian Prime Minister Narendra Modi for his leadership in elevating the U.S.-India strategic partnership. Ambassador Taranjit Singh Sandhu accepted the medal on behalf of Prime Minister Modi.” – NSA Robert C. O’Brien
73.	Australia	Prime Minister		Scott Morrison	Commonwealth of Australia	December 21, 2020	“President @realDonaldTrump awarded the Legion of Merit to Australian Prime Minister Scott Morrison for his leadership in addressing global challenges and promoting collective security. Ambassador @A_Sinodinos accepted the medal on behalf of PM Morrison.” – NSA Robert C. O’Brien
74.	Japan	Former Prime Minister		Shinzo Abe	Japan Self-Defense Forces	December 21, 2020	“President @realDonaldTrump awarded the Legion of Merit to Japanese Former Prime Minister Shinzo Abe for his leadership in addressing global challenges and promoting collective security. Ambassador Shinsuke Sugiyama accepted the medal on behalf of Former PM Abe.” – NSA Robert C. O’Brien
75.	Morocco	King	Commander-in-Chief	Mohammed VI	Royal Moroccan Armed Forces	January 15, 2021	"His vision and personal courage — including his decision to resume ties with the State of Israel — have positively reshaped the landscape of the Middle East and North Africa and ushered in a new era of security and prosperity for both our countries and the world," a White House statement said.
76.	Bahrain	King	Commander-in-Chief	Hamad bin Isa Al Khalifa	Bahrain Defence Force	January 19, 2021	

== Commander ==
Nationality	Rank	Name	Force	Date	Comments
Brazil	Brigadier General	Alexandre Zacharias de Assumpção	Brazilian Army	1942	General of Brigade Alexandre Zacharias de Assumpcao, Brazilian Army, was cited for service as Commanding General of the 8th Military Region, Brazil. The 8th Military Region was headquartered in Belem, which was a major support base for US aircraft transiting to North Africa and the Mediterranean. The Army made 31 awards of the Legion of Merit, commander grade, to Brazilian officers during World War II.
Brazil	Brigadier General	Amaro Soares Bittencourt	Brazilian Army	1942	First recipient of this medal in any degree.
Australia	Rear Admiral	Harold Farncomb, CB, DSO, MVO, RAN	Royal Australian Navy	1942	Commanded various International military units.
Canada	Major General	George Pearkes VC PC CC CB DSO MC CD	Canadian Army	1942	General officer commanding in chief Pacific Command (Canadian Army)
United Kingdom	Major General	Leslie Burtonshaw Nicholls, CBE	British Army, Chief Signals Officer, Allied Force Headquarters,	July 1, 1943	For exceptionally meritorious conduct in the performance of outstanding services to the United States and the Allied Nations. Assigned to Allied Force Headquarters 1 July 1943 when the planning for the Sicilian Campaign was in progress, and with great problems of communications and supply facing him, Major General Nicholls, with his sound knowledge and tireless energy, quickly overcame all difficulties. During the Sicilian and Italian Campaigns Major General Nicholls displayed the highest organizating ability, ensuring vital communications without which to many successful battles could not have been fought.
United Kingdom	Wing Commander	Guy Penrose Gibson, VC, DSO*, DFC*	Royal Air Force	December 3, 1943	WWII leader of the Dams raid (Operation Chastise) in 1943.
France	Brigadier General	Paul Devinck	French Army	1943	
France	Lieutenant General	Louis Koeltz	French Army	1943	Commander of XIXth Army Corps
France	Brigadier General	François Le Clercq	French Army	1943	
USSR	Colonel General Of Aviation	Alexander Repin	Soviet Air Force	June 22, 1944	President Roosevelt presented the award for further delivery to Marshal Stalin on February 11, 1945, at the Yalta Conference.
USSR	Lieutenant General	Sarkis Martirosyan	Soviet Army	July 26, 1944	
Poland	Lieutenant General	Władysław Anders	2nd Polish Corps	August 1, 1944	
France	Major General	Paul Bergeron	French Army	1944	
France	General	Étienne Beynet	French Army	1944	Head of the French Military Mission to Washington
France	General	Georges Catroux	French Army	1944	Governor General of French Algeria
France	General (later Maréchal de France)	Jean de Lattre de Tassigny	French Army	1944	Commander of the French Forces in Italy
France	Lieutenant General	Henry Martin	French Army	1944	Commander of the French Forces in Corsica
France	Brigadier General	Louis Rivet	French Army	1944	Former Head of French Military Intelligence
United Kingdom	Air Marshal	Sir Francis John Linnell, KBE, CB	Royal Air Force	January 30, 1945	Deputy commander-in-chief (RAF MED ME) Mediterranean Allied Air Forces, 29 February 1944 – 29 June 1944. Awarded posthumously by Franklin D. Roosevelt.
United Kingdom	Admiral	Sir Gerald Charles Dickens, KCVO, CB, CMG	Royal Navy	1945	WWII Commander
United Kingdom	Air Commodore	Andrew James Wray Geddes, CB, DSO, MVO,	Royal Air Force	1945	Responsible for the planning of Operations Manna and Chowhound
United Kingdom	Air vice-marshal	Frank Inglis	Royal Air Force	December 3, 1947	
United Kingdom	Air vice-marshal	Charles Edmonds	Royal Air Force	December 3, 1947	
United Kingdom	Air vice-marshal	Arthur Sanders	Royal Air Force	December 3, 1947	
Canada	Air vice-marshal	George Owen Johnson	Royal Canadian Air Force	December 3, 1947	
United Kingdom	Major General	Sir Miles Graham, KBE, CB, MC	British Army	April 24, 1945	Responsible for organising and coordinating activities in connection with the invasion of Normandy in June 1944.
New Zealand	Lieutenant General	Sir Bernard Cyril Freyberg, VC, KCB, KBE, CMG, DSO***	2nd New Zealand Division, New Zealand Military Forces	August 2, 1945	
Mexico	Colonel	Antonio Cárdenas Rodríguez	Mexican Air Force	1945	Commander of the Mexican Expeditionary Air Force, which participated in the Battle of Luzon
Czechoslovakia	General	Sergěj Ingr	Czechoslovak Armed Forces	1945	Minister of National Defense of the Czechoslovak government-in-exile 1940-44
South Africa	Major General	William Henry Evered Poole, CB, CBE, DSO	6th South African Armored Division		Unit is part of the 5th US Army during the Italian Campaign in World War II
Czechoslovakia	General	Ludvík Svoboda	Czechoslovak Army	1946	Minister of Defence of Czechoslovakia
UK	Major General	Sir Donald Banks, KCB, DSO, MC, TD	Petroleum Warfare Department	January 24, 1946	For his role in the production and manufacture of an improved American flamethrower fuel, and other work of Petroleum Warfare Department employed during the liberation of Europe which "contributed substantially to the successful prosecution of the war".
Canada	Brigadier General	John Ernest Genet, CBE MC	Canadian Army	March 30, 1946	Chief Signal Officer, First Canadian Army.
Canada	Major General	Georges Vanier, DSO MC*	Canadian Army	1946	Canadian representative to the United Nations and Ambassador to France, later Governor General of Canada.
Canada	Rear Admiral	Leonard W. Murray, CB CBE	Canadian Northwest Atlantic	1946	Architect of the Battle of the Atlantic.
Sweden	Lieutenant General	Bengt Nordenskiöld	Swedish Air Force	July 9, 1946	Chief of the Air Force
New Zealand	Air Chief Marshal	Sir Keith Park, GCB, KBE, MC*, DFC	Royal Air Force	June 27, 1947	WWII commander during the Battle of Britain and later Allied Air Commander South East Asia
India	General	Rajendrasinhji Jadeja, DSO	Indian Army	1946	Chief of the Army Staff
Sweden	Commander 2nd Class	Prince Bertil, Duke of Halland	Swedish Navy	June 4, 1948	On June 4, 1948, President Harry S. Truman awarded Prince Bertil of Sweden the Legion of Merit, Degree of Commander, "In exceptionally meritorious conduct in the performance of outstanding services to the Government of the U.S."
Philippines	General	Alfredo M. Santos	Armed Forces of the Philippines		
Netherlands	General; Lieutenant admiral	Prince Bernhard, Prince Consort of the Netherlands	Netherlands Armed Forces		Husband of the commander-in-chief of the Netherlands Armed Forces; Was a general in the Royal Netherlands Army, Royal Netherlands East Indies Army and the Royal Netherlands Air Force and was a lieutenant admiral in the Royal Netherlands Navy. Appointed an honorary air commodore in the Royal Air Force in 1941 and later appointed to the honorary rank of air marshal by Queen Elizabeth II on 15 September 1964. Was also an honorary air commodore in the Royal New Zealand Air Force since 1948.
Thailand	General	Sarit Thanarat	Royal Thai Army	September 14, 1954	
Sweden	Rear Admiral	Moje Östberg	Swedish Navy	January 1955	Naval attaché in Washington, D.C. from 1951 to 1954.
Thailand	Marshal of the Air Force	Fuen Ronnaphagrad Ritthakhanee	Royal Thai Air Force	May 17, 1955	
Cuba	Colonel	Ramon Barquin	Armed Forces of the Republic of Cuba	1955	Military Attaché to the United States, Mexico, and Canada; Cuba Delegate to the Inter-American Defense Board; Vice-director and Joint Chiefs of Staff Commander of the Inter-American Defense Board. For his organizing and coordinating activities to eliminate coups d'état in the Americas. Barquin later became the last Commander in Chief of the Armed Forces and de facto Head of State of the Republic of Cuba in January 1959, before the Revolutionary government established by Fidel Castro. Barquin served as Chief of the Army and was later named Ambassador-at-Large to Europe in April 1959 and resigned in 1960.
Thailand	Police General	Phao Siyanon	Royal Thai Police	September 2, 1955	
Japan	General	Keizō Hayashi	Japan Self-Defense Forces (JSDF)	November 10, 1955	Chairman of the Joint Staff Council, JSDF. First Japanese recipient of this medal.
Thailand	Field Marshal	Phin Choonhavan	Royal Thai Army	May 4, 1957	Commander-in-Chief of the Royal Thai Army
Thailand	Major General	Wan Waithayakon	Royal Thai Army	January 3, 1958	
Sweden	Lieutenant General	Thord Bonde	Swedish Army	December 4, 1959	Chief of the Army. For exceptionally meritorious conduct in the performance of outstanding services to the Government of the United States, from July 1943 to September 1945 and October 1957 to March 1958.
Peru	Major General	Nicolás Lindley López	Peruvian Army	October 31, 1961	Commanding general of the Army of the Republic Peru. Awarded for "outstanding professional competence, consistent support of democratic principles, and sincere and imaginative cooperation with military representatives of the Department of the Army."
Netherlands	Major General	Willem J.I. van Breukelen	Netherlands Armed Forces	1962	
Thailand	General	Praphas Charusathien	Royal Thai Force	1962	
Sweden	Vice Admiral	Åke Lindemalm	Swedish Navy	1963	Chief of the Navy. Awarded by the United States Secretary of the Navy Fred Korth.
Germany	Lieutenant-general	Ulrich de Maizière	Bundeswehr	March 9, 1965	
Sweden	General	Torsten Rapp	Swedish Air Force	April 12, 1965	Supreme Commander of the Swedish Armed Forces. "General Rapp has shown outstanding and exemplary leadership, and that he has meritoriously contributed to the friendly relations between Sweden and the United States." Awarded by General Earle Wheeler.
Thailand	Air Chief Marshal	Dawee Chullasapya	Royal Thai Air Force	July 27, 1967	
Jordan	Lieutenant-general	Amer Khammash	Jordanian Armed Forces	April 3, 1969	Chairman of the Joint Chiefs of Staff of the Jordanian Armed Forces from 9 October 1967 till 30 June 1969. Awarded by President Richard Nixon for Exceptionally Meritorious Conduct in the Performance of Outstanding Services throughout his entire military career with the Arab Army.
Greece	General	Odysseus Aggelis	Greek Armed Forces	April 5, 1971	Chief of the Greek Armed Forces from April 1967 till August 1973. Awarded by order of the US President Richard Nixon for Exceptionally Meritorious Conduct in the Performance of Outstanding Services from December 1968 to March 1971.
Thailand	Admiral	Sangad Chaloryu	Chief of Defence Forces	1975	
India	Admiral	Jal Cursetji	Indian Navy	1978	Chief of the Naval Staff
Sweden	General	Lennart Ljung	Swedish Army	1980	Supreme Commander of the Swedish Armed Forces. Awarded by General David C. Jones.
Sudan	Major General	Mohamed Mirgani Eltahir	Sudanese Air Force	August 11, 1981	Chief of Sudanese Air Force Major Gen. Mohamed was conferred with the US Legion of Merit Medal for his exceptionally meritorious conduct in the performance of outstanding services from August 1978 to August 1981.
Poland	Lieutenant-general	Stefan Grot-Rowecki	Polish Armed Forces (Armia Krajowa)	August 9, 1984	Awarded by Ronald Reagan posthumously forty years and one week after his death at the hands of the Gestapo.
Thailand	General	Chavalit Yongchaiyudh	Royal Thai Army	January 15, 1988	Chief of Defence Forces
Thailand	Air Chief Marshal	Kaset Rojananil	Royal Thai Air Force	June 1, 1990June 1, 1990	Commanders-in-Chief of the Royal Thai Air Force
Philippines	General	Fidel Ramos	Armed Forces of the Philippines	1990	
Bangladesh	Brigadier General	Abdul Muneem Mansur Ahmed	Bangladesh Army	January 16, 1991	The first Bangladeshi General to receive this award for his outstanding service as the Defense Attaché in the Bangladesh Embassy, United States
France	Lieutenant General	Michel Roquejeoffre	French Army	July 14, 1991	
Israel	General	Ehud Barak	Israel Defense Forces	1992	Later became Israeli Prime Minister from 1999 to 2001
Argentina	Teniente General	Martín Balza	Argentine Army	1994	Chief of Argentine Armed Forces 1991 to 1999
Canada	General	Alfred John Gardyne Drummond de Chastelain, OC, CMM, CH, CD	Canadian Forces	1995	In 1999, he was made a Companion of Honour by Queen Elizabeth II. He is the former Chief of the Defence Staff for the Canadian Forces and he is the Chairman of the Independent International Commission on Decommissioning since November 1995 for the Northern Ireland Peace Process.
Colombia	General	I. M. Elias Nino Herrera	Colombian Marine Corps		For exceptionally meritorious conduct in the performance of outstanding service as Commandant of the Colombian Marine Corps. General Nino's cooperation and understanding have been a significant contribution to the mutual friendship between Colombia and the United States.
United Kingdom	Lieutenant General	Michael Walker, KCB, CMG, CBE	Implementation Force in Bosnia	May 13, 1997	Former Chief of the Defence Staff (CDS) in the United Kingdom
Ecuador	General de Ejército (General of the Army)	Paco Moncayo	Ecuadorian Armed Forces	January 1998	For of his exceptionally superior performance as Chief of the Armed Forces Joint Command and his contribution to Ecuadorian history, politics and democracy.
Australia	Vice Admiral	Donald Chalmers, AO, RAN	Royal Australian Navy	1998	Chief of Navy
Australia	General	Sir Phillip Bennett, AC, KBE, DSO; John Baker, AC, DSM; Sir Peter Cosgrove, AK, MC	Australian Defence Force		Chiefs of the Defence Force
Germany	General	Adolf Heusinger; Klaus Naumann; Wolfgang Schneiderhan; Carl-Hubertus von Butler	Bundeswehr		
France	General	Edgard de Larminat; Alain de Boissieu; Vincent Desportes; Jean-Louis Georgelin			
Thailand	General	Mongkol Amphonpisit	Royal Thai Army	December 1, 1999	Chief of Defence Forces
Thailand	General	Surayud Chulanont	Royal Thai Army	December 20, 2000	Commander-in-Chief of the Royal Thai Army
Thailand	Air Chief Marshal	Sanan Thuathip	Royal Thai Air Force	February 8, 2001	Commanders-in-Chief of the Royal Thai Air Force
Australia	Vice Admiral	David Shackleton AO, RAN	Royal Australian Navy	2001	Chief of Navy
Malaysia	General	Md Hashim bin Hussein	Royal Malaysia Army	2001	Chief of Army
Germany	General	Wolfgang Schneiderhan	Bundeswehr		
Turkey	General	Hilmi Özkök	Turkish Armed Forces	2002	
Australia	Vice Admiral	Chris Ritchie AO, RAN	Royal Australian Navy		Chief of Navy
Israel	Major General	Yedidya Ya'ari	Israeli Navy	December 4, 2003	Commander in Chief, Israel Navy
Canada	Lieutenant General	Charles Bouchard OC CMM MSC CD	Deputy Commander NORAD	2004	Commander of NATO forces enforcing "No Fly Zone" Libya 2011
Pakistan	Admiral	Shahid Karimullah	Pakistan Navy	July 21, 2004	For his steadfast support of American-Pakistan cooperation in regional maritime, security affairs, demonstrated superb resolve and unwavering dedication to the Global War on terrorism
Australia	Lieutenant General	Peter Leahy AC	Australian Army	2004	Chief of Army
Argentina	Admiral	Jorge Godoy	Argentine Navy	October 1, 2004	Chief of Staff, Argentine Navy
Japan	General	Yoshimitsu Tsumagari	Japan Air Self-Defense Force	October 19, 2004	Chief of Staff, Air Self Defense Force
Turkey	Commander-in-Chief	Mehmet Yaşar Büyükanıt	Turkish Armed Forces	December 12, 2005	
Bangladesh	Lieutenant General	Hasan Mashhud Chowdhury	Bangladesh Army	2005	Former Chief of Army Staff (Bangladesh)
Italy	Admiral	Giampaolo Di Paola	Italian Navy		Incumbent Minister of Defence in the Monti Cabinet
Pakistan	Admiral	Afzal Tahir	Pakistan Navy	January 23, 2006	Legion of Merit in recognition of his efforts in conducting maritime security operations and strengthening of cooperation between the two navies in the 5th Fleet area of responsibility.
Malaysia	Admiral	Mohd Anwar Mohd Nor	Malaysian Armed Forces	2006	
Japan	General	Tadashi Yoshida	Japan Air Self-Defense Force	October 24, 2006	Chief of Staff, Air Self Defense Force
Canada	Lieutenant General	Andrew Leslie	Canadian Army	December 8, 2006	
Russia	Admiral of the Fleet	Vladimir Vasilyevich Masorin	Russian Navy	August 24, 2007	The first Russian recipient for meritorious conduct of the Russian Federation Navy to increase cooperation and interoperability with the U.S. Navy and the North Atlantic Treaty Organization from September 2005 to August 2007.
Japan	General	Ryoichi Oriki	Ground Self-Defense Force	October 1, 2007	Chief of Staff
Pakistan	Lt General	Tariq Khan	Pakistani Army	December 9, 2007	Legion of Merit for meritorious services as a liaison officer at CENTCOM during Operations Enduring Freedom (December 9, 2007).
Poland	General	Franciszek Gągor	Polish Armed Forces	May 22, 2008	For exceptionally meritorious service as the Chief of Staff of the Polish Armed Forces from February 2006 to May 2008.
Israel	Lieutenant General Hebrew: Rav Aluf	Gabi Ashkenazi	Israeli Defence Forces	July 24, 2008	Chief of Staff – Israeli Defence Forces
South Africa	Vice Admiral	Refiloe Johannes Mudimu	South African Navy	2008	For role in strengthening ties with US Navy
Japan	General	Toshio Tamogami	Air Self-Defense Force	August 19, 2008	
Pakistan	General	Ashfaq Parvez Kayani	Pakistani Army	January 1, 2009	
Australia	Lieutenant General	Ken Gillespie AC, DSC, CSM	Australian Army	2009	Chief of Army
Sweden	General	Sverker Göranson	Swedish Armed Forces	2010	Supreme Commander of the Swedish Armed Forces. For dedication and professionalism as supreme commander led the continuing transformation of the Swedish Armed Forces and the Swedish international operations.
Japan	General	Kenichiro Hokazono	Japan Air Self-Defense Force	January 22, 2010	Chief of Staff, Air Self Defense Force
Iraq	General	Babaker Shawkat B. Zebari	Iraqi Army	January 7, 2010	
Pakistan	Admiral	Noman Bashir	Pakistan Navy	March 18, 2010	For distinguished service and strengthening American-Pakistani relations. Also, for his role in establishing and strengthening the Pakistan Navy and U.S. Navy relations in Arabian Sea.
Sri Lanka	Major General	Milinda Peiris RWP, RSP, USP	Sri Lanka Army		For service as military attaché to the Sri Lankan Embassy in the United States
South Africa	General	Godfrey Ngwenya	South African Army	May 20, 2010	for his leadership during a time of transition in the South African military and his country's support of vital NATO peacekeeping operations in Sudan, Burundi and Congo
Australia	Vice Admiral	Russ Crane AO, CSM, RAN	Royal Australian Navy		Chief of Navy
Pakistan	Air Chief Marshal	Rao Qamar Suleman	Pakistan Air Force	August 5, 2010	For the performance of outstanding services March 2009 to August 2010.
Japan	General	Yoshifumi Hibako	Ground Self-Defense Force	June 8, 2011	Chief of Staff
Austria	General	Edmund Entacher	Austrian Armed Forces	November 22, 2011	Chief of Staff
Thailand	Air Chief Marshal	Itthaporn Subhawong	Royal Thai Air Force	December 21, 2011	Commanders-in-Chief of the Royal Thai Air Force
Israel	Major General	Ido Nehoshtan	Israeli Air Force	April 15, 2012	Chief of IAF
Thailand	Admiral	Surasak Runroengrom	Royal Thai Navy	April 19, 2012	Commander-in-Chief of the Royal Thai Navy
Estonia	General	Ants Laaneots	Estonian Defence Forces	July 4, 2012	Former Commander-in-Chief
Australia	Lieutenant General	David Morrison AO	Australian Army	2012	Chief of Army
Australia	General	David Hurley AC, DSC	Australian Army	2012	Chief of the Defence Force
Canada	Colonel	Todd Balfe	Royal Canadian Air Force	June 5, 2012	For his exceptional devotion to duty, and his significant contributions both to the maintenance of North American air security as well as to the close relationship between United States and Canadian Forces in NORAD.
Hungary	Colonel General	Tibor Benkő	Hungarian Ground Forces	September 4, 2012	Chief of the General Staff of the Armed Forces
Sweden	Major General	Berndt Grundevik	Swedish Army	September 2012; 29 April 2015	Inspector of the Swedish Army; Head of Swedish delegation to NNSC
Nepal	Brigadier General	Shamsher Thakurathi	Nepal Army	January 29, 2013	
Italy	Lieutenant General	Claudio Graziano	Italian Army	February 11, 2013	Chief of the General Staff of the Italian Army
Canada	Vice Admiral	Paul Maddison CMM MSM CD	Royal Canadian Navy	April 26, 2013	Commander of the Royal Canadian Navy
Australia	Vice Admiral	Ray Griggs AO, CSC, RAN	Royal Australian Navy	May 2013	Chief of Navy
Thailand	General	Prayut Chan-o-cha	Royal Thai Army	September 20, 2013	Commander-in-Chief of the Royal Thai Army
India	General	Bikram Singh	Indian Army	December 5, 2013	Chief of the Army Staff
Denmark	General	Knud Bartels	Danish Army	October 2014	During his visit at the Pentagon General Bartels was awarded the Legion of Merit by General Dempsey in recognition of his exceptional conduct while serving as Chief of Defence of the Danish Armed Forces (2009–2011) and as chairman of the NATO Military Committee.
Pakistan	General	Raheel Sharif	Pakistan Army	November 19, 2014	Chief of Army Staff Gen Raheel Sharif on November 19, 2014, was conferred with the US Legion of Merit Medal in recognition of his brave leadership and efforts to ensure peace in the region.
Turkey	General	Hulusi Akar	Turkish Armed Forces	January 27, 2015	For his outstanding contributions to the North Atlantic Treaty Organization (NATO).
Tunisia	General	Ismail Fathalli	Tunisian Army	April 13, 2015	Chief of Army Staff General Ismail Fathalli was presented with the United States Legion of Merit.
Canada	Vice Admiral	Mark Norman CMM CD	Royal Canadian Navy	April 21, 2015	VAdm Mark G. Norman received the award in honor of his leadership of the Royal Canadian Navy's successful anti-drug operations in and around Central America.
Georgia	Lieutenant General	Devi Chankotadze	Georgian Armed Forces	May 2, 2015	Chief of Joint Staff of the Georgian Armed Forces
Bangladesh	Brigadier General	Mohammad Abdul Moeen	Bangladesh Army	July 31, 2015	Brigadier General Moeen received this prestigious medal for his exceptional meritorious service as the Bangladesh Defense, Military, Naval and Air Attache to the United States, from May 2010 to July 2013. Brigadier General Moeen facilitated cooperation between the United States and Bangladesh Armies in numerous events through United States Pacific Command, to include those focused on peacekeeping operations, disaster management and counter terrorism.
Israel	Lieutenant General	Gadi Eizenkot	Israel Defense Forces	August 2016	Chief of General Staff of the Israel Defense Forces
New Zealand	Lieutenant General	Timothy James Keating, CNZM	New Zealand Army	November 1, 2016	Chief of Defence Force
Pakistan	Admiral	Muhammad Zakaullah	Pakistan Navy	March 17, 2017	Chief of Naval Staff Admiral Muhammad Zakaullah was presented with the United States Legion of Merit.
Australia	Lieutenant General	Angus Campbell, AO, DSC	Australian Army	June 13, 2017	Chief of Army
Jordan	Lieutenant General	Mahmoud Freihat	Jordanian Armed Forces	July 2017	Chairman of the Joint Chiefs of Staff of the Jordanian Armed Forces
Kuwait	Major General	Khalid Saleh Al-Sabah	Kuwaiti Armed Forces	April 2017	Commander, Kuwait Land Forces
Israel	Major General	Amir Eshel	Israeli Air Force	August 2017	On change of command of the Israeli Air Force, awarded as outgoing commander.
UK	Major General	Robert Magowan, CB, CBE	Royal Marines	October 10, 2017	Third Sea Lord
Czech Republic	General	Petr Pavel	Army of the Czech Republic	March 8, 2018	Presented by General Joseph Dunford for service as Chairman of NATO Military Committee.
Pakistan	Air Chief Marshal	Sohail Aman	Pakistan Air Force	March 12, 2018	Chief of Pakistan Air Force Air Chief Marshal Sohail Aman was presented with the United States Legion of Merit.
Canada	Lieutenant General	Michael Hood, CMM, CD	Royal Canadian Air Force	May 4, 2018	Commander, Royal Canadian Air Force
UK	General	Sir Nicholas Carter, KCB, CBE, DSO, ADC Gen	British Army	May 14, 2018	Chief of the General Staff
Lithuania	Lieutenant General	Jonas Vytautas Žukas	Lithuanian Armed Forces	August 15, 2018	Chief of Defence of Lithuanian Armed Forces
India	General	Dalbir Singh Suhag	Indian Army	August 17, 2018	Chief of the Army Staff
Georgia	Major General	Vladimer Chachibaia	Georgian Armed Forces	August 29, 2018	Chief of General Staff of Georgian Armed Forces
UK	Air Chief Marshal	Sir Stuart Peach, GBE, KCB, ADC, DL	Royal Air Force	October 2018	Chairman of the NATO Military Committee
Spain	General	Fernando Alejandre Martínez	Spanish Army	October 18, 2018	Chief of the Defence Staff
Estonia	General	Riho Terras	Estonian Defence Forces	November 13, 2018	Commander of the Estonian Defence Forces
Mexico	Secretary of National Defense	Salvador Cienfuegos Zepeda	Mexican Armed Forces	November 16, 2018	Presented to Cienfuegos for his "extraordinary contributions in strengthening the relationships between the militaries of Mexico and the United States."
Japan	Admiral	Katsutoshi Kawano	Japan Self-Defense Forces(JSDF)	March 21, 2019	Chief of Staff, Joint Staff
Australia	Air Marshal	Leo Davies, AO, CSC	Royal Australian Air Force	April 12, 2019	Chief of Air Force (Australia)
UK	Admiral	Sir Philip Jones, KCB, ADC, DL	Royal Navy	May 1, 2019	First Sea Lord
Netherlands	Brigadier General	Jeff Mac Mootry	Royal Netherlands Marine Corps	June 4, 2019	Commandant Royal Netherlands Marine Corps
Thailand	General	Pornpipat Benyasri	Royal Thai Army	June 18, 2019	Chief of Defence Forces
Iraq	General	Othman al-Ghanmi	Iraqi Armed Forces	July 30, 2019	Chief of the General Staff during the War in Iraq (2013-2017), for his role in the Coalition to defeat Daesh
Indonesia	General	Andika Perkasa	Indonesian Army	February 3, 2020	General Andika Perkasa was conferred the award for his initiative in strengthening relations between the Indonesian Army and US Army and also for his contribution for the security stability in the Indo-Pacific region. As per September 2021, he is the Chief of Staff of the Indonesian Army.
Singapore	Major General	Mervyn Tan	Republic of Singapore Air Force	February 11, 2020	Major General Mervyn Tan (Ret) was conferred the award for strengthening defence relations between the United States and Singapore. He is now currently serving as the Deputy Secretary of Technology in MINDEF.
Canada	Vice Admiral	Maurice Frank Ronald "Ron" Lloyd Ron Lloyd	Royal Canadian Navy	February 29, 2020	Commander Royal Canadian Navy (Ret)
Thailand	Air Chief Marshal	Johm Rungsawang		September 16, 2020	
Colombia	Admiral	Evelio Ramírez Gáfaro	Colombian Navy	September 17, 2020	Commander-in-chief of the Navy. For exceptionally meritorious service as Commander, Colombian Navy, from December 2018 to August 2020. Admiral Ramirez led the Colombian Navy and Coast Guard efforts to interdict illicit drug shipments destined for the United States, significantly contributing to Hemispheric security. Admiral Ramírez's superior effort, outstanding leadership, and personal initiative reflect great credit upon himself, the Colombian Navy, and his country.
Australia	Vice Admiral	Michael Noonan, AO, RAN	Royal Australian Navy	March 28, 2022	Chief of Navy
Thailand	General	Narongpan Jitkaewthae	Royal Thai Army	May 22, 2022	Commander-in-Chief of the Royal Thai Army
Ecuador	Rear Admiral	Brúmel Vázquez Bermúdez	Ecuadorian Navy	December 6, 2022	Chief of Navy. Exceptionally meritorious service as commanding general of the Ecuadorian Navy, from May 2021 to July 2022. He led the Ecuadorian Navy, Coast Guard, and Marine Corps efforts to advance the partnership with the United States. His superior effort, outstanding leadership, and personal initiative reflect great credit upon himself, the Ecuadorian Navy, and his country.
Sweden	Major General	Karl Engelbrektson	Swedish Army	December 19, 2022	Chief of Army. Awarded by the chief of staff of the United States Army, General James C. McConville
Singapore	Major General	Kelvin Khong	Republic of Singapore Air Force	May 10, 2023	Major General Kelvin Khong was conferred the award in recognition for his meritorious service as Chief of Air Force since 2019, in deepening long-standing bilateral ties between the United States Air Force and the Republic of Singapore Air Force, and his contributions to enhance interoperability and trust between the two Air Forces through professional exchanges and participation in exercises.
Singapore	Rear Admiral	Aaron Beng	Republic of Singapore Navy	May 26, 2023	Rear Admiral Aaron Beng was presented the medal in recognition of his leadership and contributions as Chief of Navy, where he had deepened the longstanding bilateral ties between the United States Navy and Republic of Singapore Navy in spite of the pandemic, and contributed to the quick resumption of engagements to enhance interoperability between the two navies.
Singapore	Lieutenant General (RET)	Melvyn Ong	Singapore Armed Forces	June 1, 2023	Lieutenant General (RET) Melvyn Ong was presented the medal in recognition of his leadership and contributions as Chief of Defence Force, when he deepened longstanding bilateral ties between the US Military and Singapore Armed Forces. This included regular bilateral exchanges between both Armed Forces through professional engagements and participation in exercises.
United Kingdom	Admiral	Sir Tony Radakin, KCB ADC	Royal Navy	September 10, 2023	Chief of the Defence Staff
Thailand	General	Chalermpol Srisawat	Royal Thai Army	January 18, 2024	Chief of Defence Forces
New Zealand	Air Marshal	Kevin Ronald Short, AO	Royal New Zealand Air Force	April 6, 2024	Chief of Defence Force
Sweden	General	Micael Bydén	Swedish Armed Forces	May 1, 2024	General Charles Q. Brown Jr. presented the Supreme Commander of the Swedish Armed Forces General Micael Bydén the Legion of Merit, Degree of Commander. General Bydén was recognized for his visionary leadership in championing Sweden's accession to NATO and transforming the Swedish Armed Forces.
Thailand	General	Phana Khlaeoplotthuk	Royal Thai Army	2026	Lieutenant General Marcus S. Evans presented the Commander-in-chief of the Royal Thai Army General Phana Khlaeoplotthuk the Legion of Merit, Degree of Commander.

== Officer ==
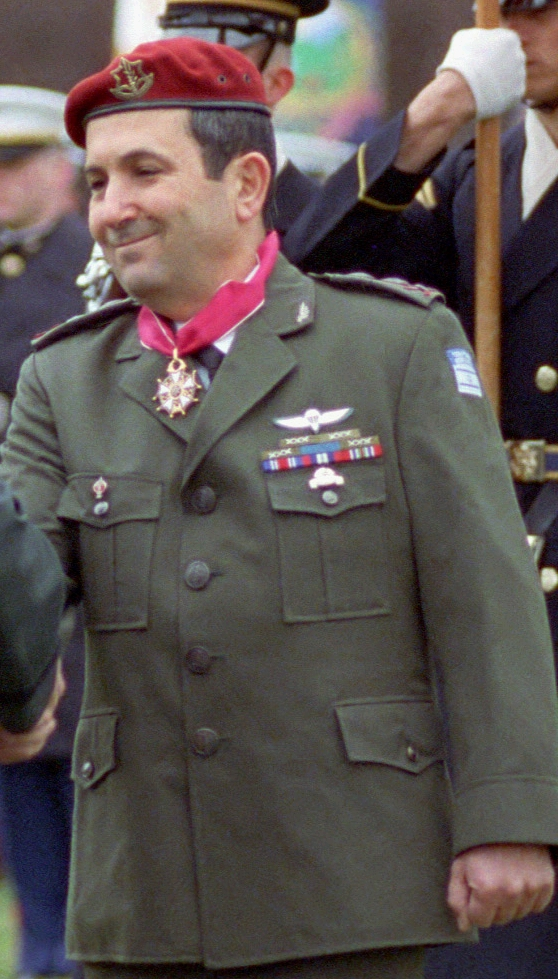
Ehud Barak, later Prime Minister of Israel, with the Legion of Merit in 1993

- At the beginning of the North African campaign, Brigadier General Lyman L. Lemnitzer accompanied Major General Mark Wayne Clark by submarine to North Africa. Upon arrival, about 60 officers were awarded the Legion of Merit and were among the first awarded the medal. By some misunderstanding as to the rules governing the awards, these 60 American officers were awarded the degree of Officer. According to Lemnitzer, President Roosevelt was quite annoyed but did not rescind the awards. These were the only U.S. officers (or service personnel of any rank) awarded the Legion of Merit with a degree.
- In 1943 Willem Jan Kruys received the Legion of Merit (Officer) in Australia as captain of the Dutch destroyer HMNS Tjerk Hiddes for the three rescue trips to Timor in December 1942 during which 1100 people were saved from the beaches of Timor under Japanese occupation. The certificate was signed by President Roosevelt personally. In 1960 Kruys received the Legion of Merit again when retired as vice-admiral of the Royal Dutch Navy, this time with gold star and combat V.
- In March 1945, Colonel Hsieh Mang, of the Chinese Army was awarded the Legion of Merit for his work with the First American Volunteer Group "Flying Tigers".
- In 1945, Lieutenant Colonel William E. Fairbairn, a former British General Service Corps who transferred to United States as "officer in rent" to train SOE agents and later the Office of Strategic Services (OSS), for his achievements in training OSS personnel. Fairbairn eventually rose to the rank of lieutenant-colonel by the end of the war, and received the U.S. Legion of Merit (officer grade) at the specific request of "Wild Bill" Donovan, founder of the OSS. Known as the teacher of close combat fighting in Camp X and teaching defendu, a special forces close combat system. Following his instruction at Camp X, Fairbairn was rejoined by his pupil Col. Applegate to form the United States "School for Spies and Assassins", then called "Camp B", now known as Camp David. Not well known by the public because his techniques were often brutal, and were considered too dangerous to be widely publicly known. Some people considered him as a British agent in disguise and a prototype of Ian Fleming's character of James Bond. Fairbairn was also the teacher of Lt. Colonel Robert T. Frederick, the designer of Army Special Unit knife V-42 stiletto which was based on Fairbairn–Sykes commando knife. Fairbairn also a friend of Captain Dermot Michael "Pat" O'Neill, the First Special Service Force's close-combat instructor.
- In 1945, Colonel Movlid Visaitov, commander of the 255th Separate Chechen-Ingush Cavalry Regiment and the 28th Guards Regiment. Visaitov was the first Soviet officer to shake hands with General Bolling at the Elbe River.
- On 27 September 1945, General Alois Liška of the Czechoslovak Army under former U.S. command, was awarded by General Ernest N. Harmon in Prague
- For his invaluable services over the D-Day period, James Stagg was appointed an Officer of the Legion of Merit in October 1945.
- Group Captain Harry Day, Senior Officer at numerous POW camps during World War II, and significantly helped American POWs endure the captivity, as well as organizing escape operations. He received the award on July 5, 1946.
- In 1946, Commodore Alfred Victor Knight of the Royal Australian Navy was awarded the commendation for honorary services. The citation described him as a 'forceful leader' who, by his 'splendid co-operation in the conduct of a vital training programme, aggressive determination and untiring energies ... contributed materially to combined large-scale operations'.
- On 3 September 1946, Vice Admiral Henry George Harry DeWolf CBE, DSO, DSC, CD of the Royal Canadian Navy was awarded the legion of Merit officer level for honorary services. The citation description "For exceptionally meritorious conduct in the performance of outstanding service while serving as Chief Staff Officer to Rear-Admiral G.C. Jones, RCN. He frequently conferred with Commander Task Force Twenty-four and his staff in connection with planning and the operational control of the surface forces under Commander Task Force Twenty-four. His excellent professional grasp of strategic and tactical situations, together with his intelligent and co-operative attitude, contributed materially to the success of operations conducted by Commander Task force Twenty-four."
- In 1947, Colonel Valentine Patrick Terrel Vivian head of counter-espionage, Section V, and Vice-Chief of the S.I.S. or MI6. The citation reads, as deputy director of a special British agency in the European Theater of Operations from January 1943 to June 1945, rendered exceptionally devoted and meritorious service to the Allied armies, by American forces in a special province of military operations, and continuing it through the long period of preparation for the Normandy invasion and during the march into Germany, Colonel Vivian made an outstanding contribution to Allied military and to the enemy's defeat.
- On 25 September 1947, then Colonel (later Major General) Alfred H. Musson of the British Army was awarded the Legion Merit, Degree of Officer, for his service as a liaison and technical at Bell Labs, helping develop highly accurate fire control systems for artillery systems. The citation reads, "Colonel Alfred Henry Musson, British Army, during the period of active hostilities in World War II, performed exceptionally meritorious service in the field of scientific research and development. Representing in the United States the needs of the British Government in the field or fire control he devoted his personal efforts and furnished British information to aid developments of instruments in that wide field. Through his unusual knowledge of the technical material and his attitude or warm cooperation, colonel Musson contributed greatly to the success of the joint war effort."
- On 30 January 1948, Captain J. Alberto Sánchez López Commander-in-Chief of the Ecuadorian Navy, was awarded the legion of Merit officer level. The citation description "For exceptionally meritorious conduct in the performance of outstanding services to the Government of the United States from June 1944 to August 1945. He has made an essential contribution to Pan-American Solidarity in further strengthening the bond and understanding between the United States of America and Ecuador. Under his able guidance and direction, the Navy of Ecuador, cooperating with the Armed Forces of the United States, assisted in consolidating Western Hemispheric Defense during the critical period of the war."
- In 1948, then Brigadier General John Frederick Boyce Combe was made an Officer of the Legion for his contribution "to the over-all success Allied forces in Italy" during World War II.
- In 1948, Air Chief Marshal Donald Perera VSV, USP, Sri Lanka Air Force.
- In 1950 Air Commodore Leonard Birchall (Royal Canadian Air Force) was made an officer of the Legion for his life imperiling heroic actions as a Japanese POW in WWII: "His exploits became legendary throughout Japan and brought renewed faith and strength to many hundreds of ill and disheartened prisoners." – U.S. President Harry S. Truman.
- In 1953, The President of the United States of America, authorized by Act of Congress, 20 July 1942, takes pleasure in presenting the Legion of Merit, in the Degree of Officer to Major General [then Brigadier General] Ham Byong Sun, Republic of Korea Army, for exceptionally meritorious conduct in the performance of outstanding services to the Government of the United States from 28 April 1951 to 3 April 1952.
- In 1953, Major General [then Brigadier General] Kim Chum Kon, Republic of Korea Army, was made an Officer of the Legion for service 25 October 1952 – 14 February 1953.
- For service 10 September 1952 – 27 April 1954, Brigadier General Shim On Bong of the Republic of Korea Army
- For service August 1953 – March 1955, Major General Chang Kuk Chang of the Republic of Korea Army
- In 1957, Colonel Stig Wennerström was made an Officer of the Legion for serving as an air attaché in Washington, D.C. from 1952 to 1957.
- In 1958, Captain S. M. Ahsan was made an Officer of the Legion for performance of outstanding services as naval attaché to the Embassy of Pakistan, Washington, D.C. from August 1955 to July 1956.
- In 1959, Major General Mian Ghulam Jilani was made an Officer of the Legion for exceptionally meritorious conduct in the performance of outstanding services to the Government of the United States, from October 1952 to June 1955.
- In 1960 Major General Mian Hayaud Din was made an Officer of the Legion for his role as Chief of the Pakistan Military Mission to the United States from 1955 to 1960.
- In 1973 "by Direction of the President, Major General Liu Wan-Tsai, Chinese Air Force, [was] awarded the Legion of Merit (Degree of Officer) for exceptionally meritorious service as Air Attache, Embassy of the Republic of China, Washington, D.C., from 4 April 1969 to 27 July 1972."
- In 1996, Lieutenant General Roméo Dallaire of the Canadian Army was made an Officer of the Legion for his role as commander of the United Nations peacekeeping force in Rwanda during the civil war and subsequent genocide.
- On 18 December 1980 Major General Shlomo Inbar, Israel Army, was made an Officer of the Legion of Merit for his exceptionally meritorious conduct in the outstanding performance of duties as Defense and Armed Forces attache, Embassy of Israel to the United States of America, from July 1977 to August 1980.
- In 2000, Lieutenant General Danfer G. Suarez was made an Officer of the Legion "Exceptionally meritorious conduct in the performance of outstanding services as the Peruvian air attache from 1997 to 1998.
- In 2006, Lieutenant General Nick Houghton, British Army, "in recognition of gallant and distinguished services during coalition operations in Iraq."
- In 2007, Lieutenant General Sir Robert Fry, Royal Marines, "in recognition of gallant and distinguished service during coalition operations in Iraq.
- Lieutenant General Tariq Khan became the fourth Pakistani officer to receive the award for meritorious services as a liaison officer at CENTCOM during Operations Enduring Freedom (December 9, 2007).
- In 2008, Air Chief Marshal Sir Glenn Torpy Head of the Royal Air Force, for his part in Operation Telic / Operation Iraqi Freedom.
- Lieutenant General Sir James Dutton, Royal Marines, "in recognition of meritorious, gallant and distinguished services during coalition operations in Afghanistan".
- Major General Colin Boag, British Army, "in recognition of gallant and distinguished services during coalition operations in Iraq" (March 2008).
- Lieutenant General James Bucknall, British Army, "in recognition of gallant and distinguished services during coalition operations in Iraq" (July 2009).
- Major General Mohamed Elkeshky, Egyptian Army Defense, military, naval and air attaché to the United States. (2013).
- In 2011, Vice Admiral Tomohisa Takei, Japan Maritime Self-Defense Force, "as recognition for Takei's exceptional leadership and expertise in maturing and expanding the JMSDF and U.S. Navy partnership during his role as director of operations and plans department, JMSDF Maritime Staff Office from April 2008 to July 2010".
- In 2013, Lieutenant General Walter Souza Braga Netto, Brazilian Army, Military Attaché to the United States of America. "For exceptionally meritous conduct in the performance of outstanding services from March 2011 to May 2013.
- In 2014, Air Commodore David Best, United Kingdom Royal Air Force. "For exceptionally meritorious service as Director of Air Operations, International Security Assistance Force, from December 2010 to December 2011".
- In 2014, Major General Brett Cairns, Canadian Air Force, NORAD J3. "For exceptionally meritorious service as Director of Operations, Headquarters North American Aerospace Defense Command, Peterson Air Force Base, Colorado, from May 2005 to August 2008."
- In 2016, Rear Admiral Mohamed Abdelaziz Elsayed, Egyptian Navy, received the Legion of Merit (Degree of Officer) for “exceptionally meritorious service” as naval attaché at the Embassy of Egypt from April 2013 to June 2015, during which he helped improve cooperation and strengthen relations between the U.S. Navy and Egyptian Navy.
- In 2016, Brigadier General Paul Rutherford, Canadian Army, United States Central Command. "For exceptionally meritorious service as Deputy Director, Strategy, Plans and Policy Military to Military, Strategy, Plans and Policy Directorate, United States Central Command, MacDill Air Force Base, Florida, from August 2013 to August 2015."
- in 2018, Commodore Alok Bhatnagar, NSM, Indian Navy. "For Exceptionally Meritorious Conduct in the Performance of Outstanding Service as the Indian naval attache to United States of America from August 2011 to December 2014.
- In 2018, Air Commodore A. P. T. Smith (UK).
- In 2018, Air Commodore Stephen Lushington (UK). For exceptionally meritorious service, NATO Forces, Afghanistan.
- In 2019, Brigadier General Suzanne Melotte, For exceptionally meritorious service NATO Forces, Afghanistan.
- In 2021, Major General Matt Holmes Royal Marines (UK). For exceptionally meritorious service and leadership as Deputy Advisor Ministry of Interior, Afghanistan.
- In 2023, Brigadier General Anoop Shinghal, Sena Medal, (India). "For exceptionally meritorious service as Indian Defense and Military Attache to United States from 29 July 2019 to 17 Oct 2022".
- In 2023, Commodore Adrian C Fryer Royal Navy (UK). For exceptionally meritorious service and leadership as deputy commander and commander, Combined Maritime Forces.

== Legionnaire ==
When the Legion of Merit is awarded to members of the Armed Forces of the United States, it is awarded without reference to degree. However, the medal and ribbon of the fourth degree (Legionnaire) are used for members of the Armed Forces of the United States.

The US Army and US Air Force do not authorize the "V" Device for the Legion of Merit. The U.S. Navy, the U.S. Marine Corps, and the United States Coast Guard do.

The first U.S. Armed Forces recipient of the Legion of Merit medal was World War II combat veteran Lieutenant, junior grade, Ann Bernatitus, U.S.N., one of the "Angels of Bataan" and the only U.S. Navy nurse to escape from Bataan and Corregidor during the war. She was also the first person authorized to wear the "V" Device with the award. Her medal is now housed at the Smithsonian Institution.

- Salvador "Sal" Lopez, Master Gunnery Sergeant USMC
- Michael "Mick" Skinta, CWO4 "Gunner"
- Robert B. Abrams, 6 awards
- John Abizaid, 6 awards
- Frank Adamo
- Creighton W. Abrams
- Clayton Sinnott Adams
- James Bradshaw Adamson
- John R. Allen, 5 awards
- Robert S. Allen
- James F. Ponzo
- William Anderson (USN)
- Elma L. Asson
- Bernard L. Austin
- George Baker
- Michael A. Baker
- Eben Bartlett
- Roger de Bazelaire de Boucheporn
- Edward L. Beach Jr.
- Ann A. Bernatitus, with Combat "V"
- Beau Biden
- John Birch
- Deborah Birx
- William C. Bishop (May 1991), military intelligence, master sergeant)
- Guion Bluford
- George F. Bond, 3 awards
- Midian Othello Bousfield.
- Westray Battle Boyce, 2 awards
- John Boyd, 4 awards
- Omar N. Bradley
- Larry Buenafe (SgtMaj)
- William G. Bulling (Ordnance Corps, Chief Warrant Officer Four)
- Laurence E. Bunker
- Mark H. Buzby, 3 awards
- George S. Brown, 3 awards
- Gregory R. Bryant
- Larry B. Buenafe (Command SgtMaj)
- Richard E. Byrd, 2 awards
- George A. Cain (Chief Warrant Officer Four, USACIDC)
- Robert A. Caprara (Chief Warrant Officer Four, UH-60 Blackhawk Pilot)
- Scott Carpenter
- Maude E. Carraway
- John A. Carollo Citation for Legion of Merit awarded 1945. Army.
- Walter E. Carter Jr., 3 awards
- Claire Lee Chennault
- Llewellyn Chilson
- Mark Choate
- Joseph J. Clark, with Combat "V"
- Mark A. Clark (general)
- Mark W. Clark
- Vern Clark, 3 awards
- Mary E. Clarke
- William P.O. Clarke, 3 awards
- Herbert G. Claudius, USN, posthumous with Combat "V"
- Barry Ray Clayton
- Helena Clearwater
- Daniel L. Coberly
- Frank Cohn
- Jackie Cooper
- Richard LeRoy Cordes
- Charles H. Corlett
- Modesto Cartagena
- Chester V. Clifton
- Elmer Collings
- Robert W. Cone, 3 awards
- Thomas L. Constantino
- Carleton S. Coon
- William J. Crowe, 3 awards
- John H. Cushman, 3 awards
- Lyal A. Davidson, 2 awards
- Matthew K. Miller
- Philip S. Davidson, 6 awards
- Phillip Davidson, 3 awards
- Arthur C. Davis, 3 awards
- Benjamin O. Davis Jr.
- Ray Davis, 2 awards with Combat "V"
- Pete Dawkins
- George Everett "Bud" Day, 2 awards
- Michael E. DeBakey
- George H. Decker
- Ralph Van Deman
- John Holmes Dingle
- William Diver
- Michael Donoghue
- Ruby Jane Douglass
- George Doundoulakis
- Sharon K.G. Dunbar
- Robert Vance Dunbar (master sergeant)
- David Douglas Duncanon
- Laurence Durlacher
- Joseph S. Edgar
- Herbert W. Ehrgott
- Dwight D. Eisenhower
- John S. D. Eisenhower
- Dick Ellis
- Edward Ellsberg
- Douglas Fairbanks Jr.
- Martin H. Foery
- Francis Fressanges
- Fred W. Friendly
- Lee W. Fulton
- Robert E. Galer
- Julius W. Gates
- Francis T. Giesler
- Otto Glasser
- Nicholas Goodhart
- John F. Goodman, 2 awards
- Kevin H. Govern, 2 awards
- Herbert H. Goral, 2 awards
- Philip Graham
- David E. Grange Jr., 2 awards
- Philip H. Greene Jr., 4 awards
- Edward G. Grier Jr.
- James A. Grove
- Charles M. Gurganus, 2 awards
- David Hackworth, 4 awards
- Alexander Haig, 3 awards
- Robert G. Hale
- Haywood S. Hansell
- Matthew C. Harris, USAF, 2 awards
- John C. Harvey Jr., 5 awards
- SGT Ayman A. Hatkwa
- John B. Hayes
- Paul Ramsey Hawley
- Sergeant Major Richard V. Hendricks II
- Robert T. Herres, 2 awards
- William R. Higgins
- Charles A. Hines, 2 awards
- Colonel William Hockensmith, USAF
- Russel L. Honoré, 5 awards
- Grace Hopper
- Edwin Hubble
- Thomas J. Hudner
- Kenneth W. Hunzeker, 2 awards
- Louis Iasiello, 2 awards
- Joseph R. Inge, 3 awards
- Michael J. Ingelido
- Ralph Ingersoll
- Stuart H. Ingersoll, 2 awards
- William E. Ingram Jr.
- Bobby Ray Inman
- Andrew P. Iosue, 3 awards
- Frederick Augustus Irving, 2 awards
- Stafford LeRoy Irwin, 2 awards
- Emerson C. Itschner, 4 awards
- Galen B. Jackman, 2 awards
- J. Adrian Jackson
- Kevin J. Jacobsen, 2 awards
- Charles H. Jacoby Jr.
- Lowell E. Jacoby, 2 awards
- James L. Jamerson, 2 awards
- Daniel James Jr.
- Daniel James III
- Frank B. James
- Larry D. James, 3 awards
- Earl Jaques Jr.
- Harry B. Jarrett, with Combat "V"
- Samuel Jaskilka
- David E. Jeremiah, 2 awards
- Norman Jewell
- Harold K. Johnson
- Leon W. Johnson
- David C. Jones
- Robert J. T. Joy
- John J. Kaising, 2 awards
- Danis Karabelen
- Frederick J. Karch, 3 awards, 2 with Combat "V"
- Claudia J. Kennedy
- Carlton W. Kent, 2 awards
- Young-Oak Kim, 2 awards
- John Kline, 4 awards
- Joseph Caldwell King
- Jeffrey A. Kruse, 3 awards
- Gary Lambert
- Kent Lambert
- Wayne W. Lambert
- James Benjamin Lampert
- Roland Everett Langford
- Julien J. LeBourgeois, 2 awards
- Lyman L. Lemnitzer, 2 awards (1 in degree of officer)
- Carroll LeTellier, 5 awards
- Scott Lingamfelter, 2 awards
- Kirk Lippold
- Emilio S. Liwanag
- Charles A. Lockwood
- Joe Louis
- Craig B. Luigart, 2 awards
- John A. Macready
- David D. Magnin, LTC
- Robert Magnus
- Thomas T. Matteson
- Bill Mauldin
- John McCain Jr., 3 awards
- John McCain III, 2 awards and Combat "V"
- Frederick G. McCollum (provost marshal, 82nd Airborne Division 1944)
- John P. McConnell, 4 awards
- Edwin McElwain
- Charles McGee, 2 awards
- Robert McGowan Littlejohn
- Daniel Christopher McKinnon
- Danny McKnight, 2 awards
- Joe McMoneagle
- Robert S. McNamara
- James F. McNulty
- Richard R. McNulty
- William A. McNulty
- Bill McRaven, 2 awards
- Charles L. Melson, 3 awards
- Wilfred C. Menard Jr.
- Edward C. Meyer, 3 awards
- Hal Moore
- William G. Moore Jr., 6 awards
- Thomas H. Moorer
- Jill Morgenthaler
- Samuel E. Morison
- Frank A. Morreale Sr.
- Michael Mullen, 6 awards
- Carl E. Mundy III, 2 awards
- Audie Murphy
- Dennis J. Murphy (2 awards)
- Florence K. Murray
- Richard Nations
- David Niven
- Eric T. Olson
- Merlin O'Neill
- Mark Anthony Ostbloom (Chief Warrant Officer Four)
- William Owens (admiral), 4 awards
- Susan Pamerleau
- Wilfred L. Painter, (USN Captain, CEC) 5 awards four with combat "V"
- Robert J. Papp Jr., 4 awards
- Theodore W. Parker, 2 awards
- Joseph Kline PaskVan II
- Randolph M. Pate, 2 awards with Combat "V"
- George S. Patton
- Paul Pennoyer Sr.
- Elizabeth A. Pesut
- Joel M. Peterson
- David Petraeus
- Leroy A. Petry
- Samuel Perez Jr., 2 awards
- Arthur Blurton Plant
- Colin Powell, 2 awards
- L. Fletcher Prouty
- Chesty Puller, 2 awards with Combat "V"
- David E. Quantock, 3 awards
- Kevin M. Quinn
- William Wilson Quinn
- Donald W. Reynolds
- L. Scott Rice
- Hyman G. Rickover, 2 awards
- Paul E. Richter
- Matthew B. Ridgway, 2 awards
- Paul X. Rinn
- Thomas H. Robbins Jr., 2 awards
- Darryl Roberson, 3 awards
- Joseph John Rochefort
- MSG Alberto M. Rodriguez
- Bernard W. Rogers, 4 awards
- William C. Rogers III
- John Dale Ryan
- F. A. Sampson
- David Sarnoff
- Harold G. Schrier
- Raymond L. Shoemaker, 4 awards
- Norman Schwarzkopf Jr.
- Edmund Wilson Searby
- Benedict J. Semmes Jr., 2 awards
- James E. Service, 3 awards
- Thomas K. Shannon, 4 awards
- Walter L. Sharp
- John M. Shalikashvili, 3 awards
- Clay Shaw
- Henry Shelton
- David M. Shoup, 2 awards with Combat "V"
- Jacob L. Shuford, 5 awards
- Ivan L. Slavich Jr. 3 awards
- Gregory J. Slavonic, current Assistant Secretary of the Navy for Manpower and Reserves
- Carl M. Smeigh Jr.
- John Calvin Smith
- Russell L. Smith, 2 awards, current master chief petty officer of the Navy
- Dale Snodgrass, 3 awards
- Lawrence F. Snowden, 5 awards with Combat "V"
- EJ Snyder
- Oscar P. Snyder
- James G. Stavridis, 5 awards
- George Stevens
- Joseph D. Stewart
- James B. Stockdale
- Douglas M. Stone
- LTC Mark W. Stone
- Joseph C. Strasser 3 awards
- Lewis L. Strauss
- Jack C. Stultz, 2 awards
- Rosalie L. Swenson
- Gordon Bennett Tayloe
- Maxwell D. Taylor
- Charles W. Thomas (captain)
- Edward K. Thompson
- James D. Thurman, 4 awards
- Roy Thurman, 6 awards
- Maxwell Reid "Mad Max" Thurman
- William E. Thurman, 3 awards
- Strom Thurmond, 2 awards
- Joseph E. Tofalo
- Lauri Törni
- Katherine A. Towle
- Michael S. Tucker, 3 awards
- Stansfield Turner
- George Ray Tweed
- John Uberti
- James P. Ulm
- Henry G. Ulrich III, 5 awards
- Robin Umberg
- John Francis Uncles
- George V. Underwood Jr., 4 awards
- Ferdinand Thomas Unger, 5 awards
- Matt Urban
- Stephen Urban
- Leon L. Van Autreve, 3 awards
- Swede Vejtasa
- SFC Patrick B. Treffery
- Thomas S. Vandal
- John Vessey, 2 awards
- Jonas Vilhauer
- William von Zehle
- Dave Wallace
- Garry Walsh
- Patrick M. Walsh, 4 awards
- William "Billy" Waugh
- James S. Welch Jr.
- Mark Welsh, 2 awards
- Earle G. Wheeler
- Adriel N. Williams
- Cecil Charles Williams
- James A. Williams, 2 awards
- John Allen Williams
- Phyllis J. Wilson
- Dean Winslow
- William Westmoreland
- Jerauld Wright, 2 awards
- William P. Yarborough, 4 awards
- James C. Yarbrough, 3 awards
- Donald Norton Yates
- Ronald W. Yates, 2 awards
- Walter H. Yates Jr., 2 awards
- Chuck Yeager, 2 awards
- John J. Yeosock, 2 awards
- David G. Young III, 2 awards
- Robert Nicholas Young
- Barton Kyle Yount
- Yu Jae-hung, 2 awards
- Ellis M. Zacharias, 3 awards
- Harold A. Zahl
- Melvin Zais, 3 awards
- George D. Zamka
- Peter Zanca, 2 awards
- Babaker Shawkat B. Zebari
- James A. Zimble, 3 awards
- John S. Tuohy
- Matthew A. Zimmerman
- Ronald J. Zlatoper
- Paul F. Zukunft
- Elmo Zumwalt
- Edwin A. Zundel, 3 awards
- Ralph Wise Zwicker, 2 awards

Bryan Poteet,1SG
