= Robert G. Hale =

American oral surgeon (born 1956)

Colonel Robert G. Hale
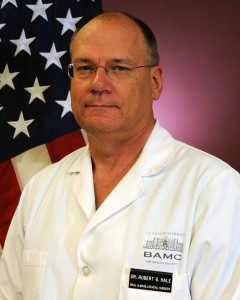
- Official Army photograph of Colonel Robert G. Hale
- Born: November 28, 1956 (age 69); Baltimore, Maryland
- Military career
- Allegiance: United States
- Branch: United States Army
- Service years: 1977–2016
- Rank: Colonel
- Commands: US Army Dental and Trauma Research Detachment
- Website: robertghale.com

Colonel Robert G. Hale (born 28 November 1956 in Baltimore, Maryland) is an oral and maxillofacial surgeon and former Commander of the US Army Dental and Trauma Research Detachment. Hale lectures worldwide on craniomaxillofacial battle injuries and regenerative medicine. He is a researcher and public advocate for the advancement and benefits of regenerative medicine.

== Education ==
Hale completed his undergraduate studies at UCLA in 1977. He earned his doctoral degree in 1981 and postdoctoral certificate in oral and maxillofacial surgery in 1989 at Emory University. Hale has held a teaching appointment at the UCLA School of Dentistry since 1990 and is a professor of Oral and Maxillofacial Surgery at the Uniformed Services University of Health Sciences in Bethesda, Maryland.

== Military career ==
Robert G. Hale was commissioned in the US Army in 1977 upon completing his undergraduate degree. He served tours in Korea and Hawaii during his original period of active duty and in Kuwait/Iraq and Afghanistan from 2003 to 2005 when he was recalled to active duty after 9/11. In 2005, Hale left his private practice in Los Angeles to serve at Brooke Army Medical Center as Oral and Maxillofacial Surgery Residency Program Director and Chief of Oral and Maxillofacial Surgery.

In 2016, Hale was featured in the book Hurt: The Inspiring, Untold Story of Trauma Care by Catherine Musemeche, MD. The book recounts the story of Dr. Hale operating on Todd Nelson while Hale was assigned to Brooke Army Medical Center. Todd Nelson was based in Kabul, Afghanistan as a senior logistics supervisor when he was severely injured in an explosion while on patrol. Hale was praised by Musemeche, who called him a "modern-day Gillies", referring to the "father of plastic surgery".

From 2009 to 2014, Hale served as Commander of the US Army Dental and Trauma Research Detachment and Director of Craniomaxillofacial Research at the US Army Institute of Surgical Research in San Antonio. While in the Army, Hale recognized the need for advanced regenerative repair for extreme facial injuries. Among other avenues of inquiry, he engaged in research on “spray-on skin, ” a concept developed by Dr. Fiona Wood, in 2011. That same year Dr. Hale’s work with injured soldiers was featured in the Pulitzer Prize–winning Huffington Post article by David Wood, “Beyond The Battlefield: New Hope, But A Long and Painful Road, For Veterans Pulled From Death’s Grasp.” In December 2013 Hale was the focus of a New York Times article, “Healing Soldiers’ Most Exposed Wounds.” Hale's research was also a front-page feature article in September 2014 Discover Magazine Issue: "New Hope for Soldiers Disfigured in War". After 32 years of service Colonel Hale retired from the Army in 2016.

== Combat Gum ==
While Hale was Commander of the US Army Dental and Trauma Research Detachment, he played a large role in the development of Combat Gum. Combat Gum is an anti-cavity gum designed to help maintain dental health in high-risk soldiers who have limited access to water. The peppermint flavored, sugar-free gum contains a synthetic sequence of anti-microbial peptides which mimic defensins (the bacteria-killing molecules naturally found in saliva. Though this gum is not a substitute for brushing, when chewed for twenty minutes three times a day it can prevent pathogens from colonizing the mouth. Combat gum is predicted to save the military a hundred million dollars annually. Aside from battle, dental emergencies account for 10 per cent of all injuries that cause soldiers to be evacuated from the battlefield. In the future, the gum is expected to be mass-produced and sold to civilians as a prescription or over the counter.

== Face transplants ==
Hale’s research into face transplantation emerged from his leadership in craniomaxillofacial trauma reconstruction for the U.S. Army, where he sought solutions for soldiers suffering devastating facial injuries from combat. As commander of the Dental and Trauma Research Detachment at the U.S. Army Institute of Surgical Research, Hale helped guide the military’s participation in the Armed Forces Institute of Regenerative Medicine (AFIRM), which explored cutting-edge approaches to restoring facial form and function. His work emphasized integrating advanced surgical techniques with regenerative medicine, using tissue scaffolds, stem-cell therapies, and vascularized composite allotransplantation (face transplantation), to move beyond traditional grafting methods. Hale’s efforts helped lay the foundation for military-supported face transplant programs that combine surgical precision with immune management and psychological rehabilitation.

== Awards ==
Hale's numerous military awards include the Legion of Merit, two Bronze Stars, the Meritorious Service Medal, the Army Commendation Medal, the Army Achievement Medal, the Armed Forces Reserve Medal with a 30-year hourglass device and the Expert Field Medical Badge. He is also recipient of the Army's Order of Military Medical Merit. The American Association of Oral and Maxillofacial Surgeons awarded Colonel Hale with the "Humanitarian Award" in 2009 with a standing ovation from the members in attendance.

== Private practice ==
Hale first established a private practice in 1989. Hale returned to private practice in 2014 after his military retirement. He specializes in dental implant surgery and regularly treats complex cases.

== Inventions ==
Inventions
Application Number	Filing Date	Patent/Reg No.	Issue Date	Status	Case Title	Country
16/030,276	7/9/2018	US-10702319-B2	7/7/2020	Granted	An Apparatus and Method for a Trans-Alveolar Implant	US
16/866,957	5/5/2020	US-11678918	6/20/2023	Granted	An apparatus and method for a transalveolar implant continuation	US
2021-523560	7/19/2019	7451515	3/8/2024	Granted	An Apparatus and Method for a Trans-Alveolar Implant	Japan
2019301057	7/9/2019			Pending	An Apparatus and Method for a Trans-Alveolar Implant	Australia
3106161	7/9/2019			Pending	An Apparatus and Method for a Trans-Alveolar Implant	Australia
19833818.8	7/19/2019			Pending	An Apparatus and Method for a Trans-Alveolar Implant	Europe
2021-7003565	7/9/2019			Pending	An Apparatus and Method for a Trans-Alveolar Implant	Korea
62021033009.3	7/19/2019			Pending	An Apparatus and Method for a Trans-Alveolar Implant	Hong Kong
17/1553085	12/16/2021			Pending	An Apparatus and Method of an Osteotomy for Dental Implant	US
17/999,466	11/21/2022			Pending	System, Apparatus, and Method for Removing Pathogens from the Dental Operatory	US & Europe
63/572,034	3/29/2024			Pending	Apparatus and Method for Precision Osteotomy	US
18/748,828	6/20/2024			Pending	Transosseous Bone Plate Fibula Flap and Dental Implant	US

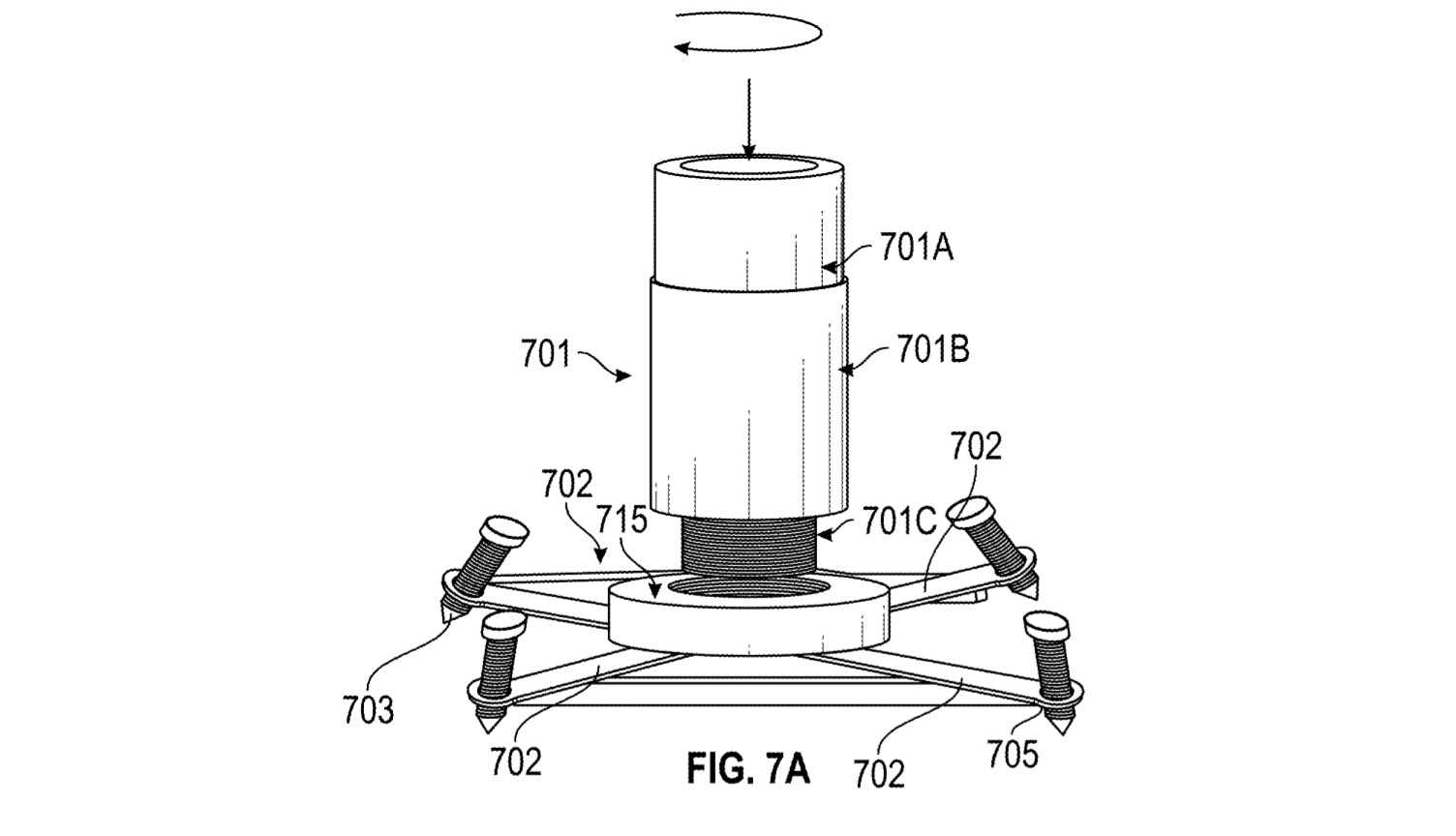
Dental post secured to the lower molar (LM) transalveolar dental implant plate, within the scope of the present disclosure

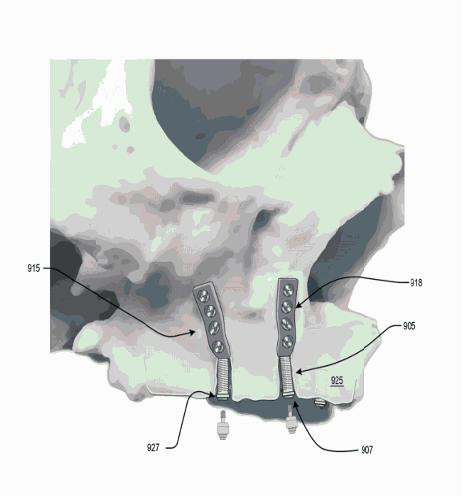
Dental post attached to custom bone plate contoured to fit vertical pillars

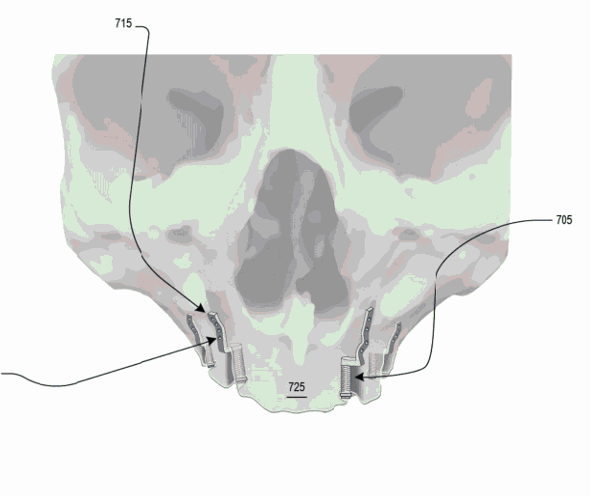
Dental post attached to custom bone plate contoured to fit vertical pillars

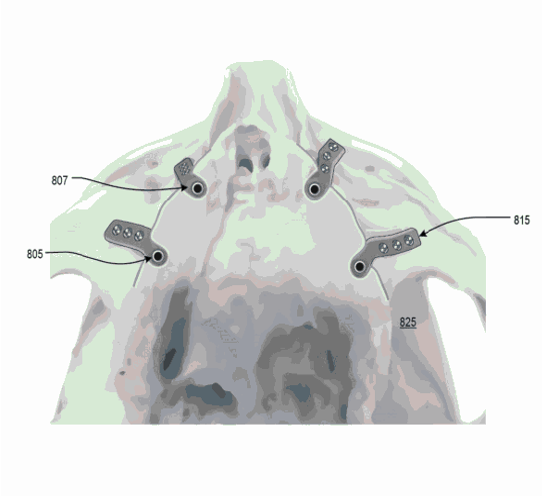
Dental post attached to custom bone plate contoured to fit vertical pillars

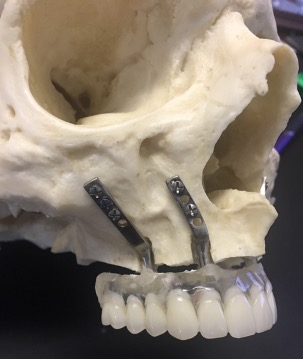
Patient specific transalveolar dental implants - side view

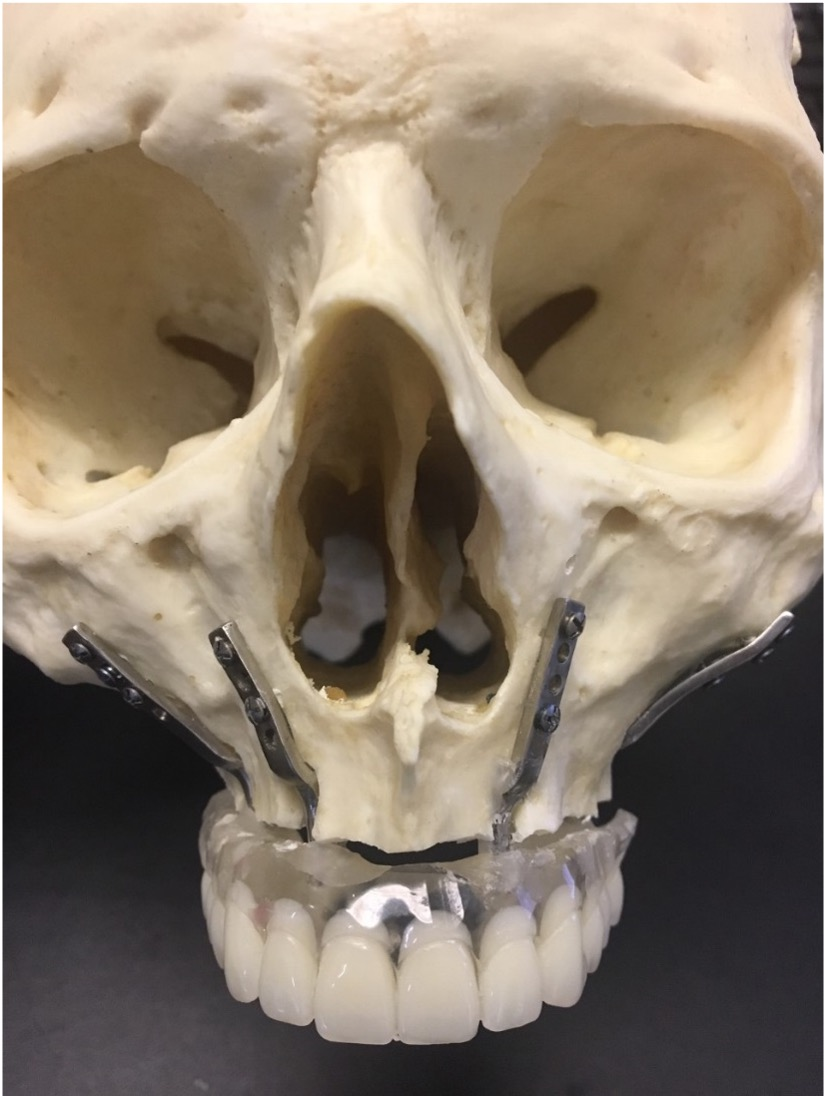
Patient specific transalveolar dental implants - front view

Hale has collaborated with the medical device manufacturer KLS Martin on the development of patient-specific surgical solutions for jaw deformities. Their work led to the creation of the KLS Martin PreProsthetic, which is the first FDA-approved device designed for the treatment of edentulous ridge deformities. The KLS Martin PreProsthetic Device represents a significant improvement over current implant technology, especially for patients with insufficient bone for conventional implant reconstruction.

== Publications ==
Hale has written extensively on combat-related injuries and complications. His published works include:

1. Bays R., Greco J., Hale Robert G. 1990. An outpatient technique for long-term stability of surgical rapid palatal expansion. Journal of Oral and Maxillofacial Surgery: Official Journal of the American Association of Oral and Maxillofacial Surgeons.
2. Hale RG, Timmis DP, Bays RA, 1991. A new mandibulotomy technique for the dentate patient. Plast Reconstr Surg. 87(2): 362-4.
3. Kerner MM, Hale RG, and Silva, K. 2002. A Novel Three-Piece Anterior Mandibular Visor Osteotomy for Genioglossus Advancement in Surgery for Obstructive Sleep Apnea. Operative Techniques in Otolaryngology – Head & Neck Surgery, 13(2): 175-177.
4. Bays Robert, Greco Joan, Hale Robert. 1992. Surgically assisted rapid palatal expansion: An Outpatient Technique with Long-Term Stability. Journal of Oral and Maxillofacial Surgery. 50(2): 110-113.
5. Orloff G, Hale RG. 2007. Mandibular Osteotomies in Orthognathic Surgery. J Craniofac. Surg, 18(4): 931-938.
6. Hospenthal DR, Murray CK, Andersen RC, Blice JP, et al., 2008. Guidelines for the prevention of infection after combat-related injuries. J Trauma. 2008 Mar; 64(3 Suppl): S211-20.
7. Petersen K, Hayes DK, Blice JP, Hale RG. 2008. Prevention and management of infections associated with combat-related head and neck injuries. J Trauma. 2008 Mar; 64(3 Suppl): S265- 76.
8. Hale RG, Tucker DI. 2008. Head and neck manifestations of tuberculosis. Oral Maxillofac Surg Clin North Am. 20(4): 635-42.
9. Reed B. E., Hale, Robert G. 2010. Training Australian military health care personnel in the primary care of maxillofacial wounds from improvised explosive devices. Journal of the Royal Army Medical Corps. 156(2):121-4.
10. Lew TA, Walker JA, Wenke JC, Blackbourne LH, Hale RG. 2010. Characterization of craniomaxillofacial battle injuries sustained by United States service members in the current conflicts of Iraq and Afghanistan. J Oral Maxillofac Surg: 68(1): 3-7.
11. Hale RG, Lew T, Wenke JC. 2010. Craniomaxillofacial Battle Injuries: Injury Patterns, Conventional Treatment Limitations and Direction of Future Research. Singapore Dental Journal, 31(1): 1-8.
12. Hale RG, Hayes DK, Orloff G, Peterson K, Powers DB, Mahadevan SV. Combat Casualty Care: Lessons Learned from OEF & OIF: Maxillofacial and Neck Trauma. 2010. [DVD]. Los Angeles, CA: Pelagique, LLC.
13. Verrett A., Mellus D., Hale Robert G., et al. 2011. Poster 74: Characterization of Craniomaxillofacial Injuries During Operations Enduring Freedom and Iraqi Freedom - A 10 Year Review. Journal of Oral and Maxillofacial Surgery. 69(9).
14. Hale, Robert G. 2011. The Military Relevance of Face Composite Tissue Allotransplantation and Regenerative Medicine Research. The Know-How of Face Transplantation. 401-409.
15. Martin GJ, Dunne JR, Cho JM, Solomkin JS, et al., 2011. Prevention of Combat-Related Infections Guidelines Panel. 2011. Prevention of infections associated with combat-related thoracic and abdominal cavity injuries. J Trauma;71: S270-S281.
16. D'Avignon LC, Chung KK, Saffle JR, Renz EM, Cancio LC, et al., 2011. Prevention of Combat-Related Infections Guidelines Panel. 2011 Prevention of infections associated with combat-related burn injuries. J. Trauma: 71: S282-9.
17. Hospenthal DR, Murray CK, Andersen RC, et al., 2011. Executive summary: Guidelines for the prevention of infections associated with combat-related injuries: 2011 update: endorsed by the Infectious Diseases Society of America and the Surgical Infection Society. 71(2 Suppl 2): S202- 9.
18. Hospenthal DR, Murray CK, Andersen RC, et al., 2011. Guidelines for the prevention of infections associated with combat-related injuries: 2011 update: endorsed by the Infectious Diseases Society of America and the Surgical Infection Society. J Trauma. 71(2 Suppl 2): S210- 34.
19. Petersen K, Colyer MH, Hayes DK, Hale RG, Bell RB. 2011. Prevention of infections associated with combat-related eye, maxillofacial, and neck injuries. Prevention of Combat- Related Infections Guidelines Panel. J Trauma. 71(2 Suppl 2): S264-9.
20. Chan Rodney K., Siller-Jackson, Verrett Adam J., et al. 2012. Ten years of war: A characterization of craniomaxillofacial injuries incurred during operations Enduring Freedom and Iraqi Freedom. Journal of Trauma and Acute Care Surgery. 73(6):S453-S458.
21. Blackbourne Lorne H., Baer David, Eastridge Brian, et al. 2012. Military medical revolution: Military trauma system. Journal of Trauma & Acute Care Surgery. 73(6):S388-S394.
22. Kittle Christopher P., Verrett Adam J., Wu Jesse, et al. 2012. Characterization of Midface Fractures Incurred in Recent Wars. The Journal of Craniofacial Surgery. 23(6): 1587-91.
23. Dumas JE, BrownBaer PB, Prieto EM, Guda T, Hale RG, Wenke JC, Guelcher SA. 2012. Injectable reactive biocomposities for bone healing in critical-size rabbit calvarial defects. Biomed Mater. 7(2): 024112.
24. Peacock ZS, Kademani D, Le AD, Lee JS, Hale RG, Cunningham LL Jr. 2012. Proceedings from the 2011 American Association of Oral and Maxillofacial Surgeons research summit. J Oral Maxillofac Surg. 70(6): 1271-9.
25. Madison Andrew Q., Tucker David, Aden Jay, et al. 2013. Non-battle craniomaxillofacial injuries from U.S. military operations. Journal of cranio-maxillo-facial surgery: official publication of the European Association for Cranio-Maxillo-Facial Surgery 41(8).
26. Tucker David I., Zachar Michael R., Chan Rodney K., et al. 2013. Characterization and Management of Mandibular Fractures: Lessons Learned from Iraq and Afghanistan. Atlas of the oral and maxillofacial surgery clinics of North America 21(1):61-8.
27. Rettinger Christina L, Fourcaudot Andrea B, Hong Seok J, et al. 2013. In vitro characterization of scaffold-free three-dimensional aggregates for wound repair and regeneration. Wound Repair and Regeneration. 21(2):A40-A40.
28. Hale, Robert G. 2013. Challenges in Craniofacial Reconstruction Following Trauma. Conference: American Association for the Advancement of Science 2013 Annual Meeting.
29. Zachar Michael R., Labella Carl, Kittle Christopher P., et al. 2013. Characterization of Mandibular Fractures Incurred from Battle Injuries in Iraq and Afghanistan from 2001-2010. Journal of Oral and Maxillofacial Surgery: Official Journal of the American Association of Oral and Maxillofacial Surgeons. 71(4).
30. Fletcher John L., Caterson Edward, Hale Robert G., et al. 2013. Characterization of Skin Allograft Use in Thermal Injury. Journal of Burn Care & Research: Official Publication of the American Burn Association. 34(1): 168-75.
31. Chavez-Munoz Claudia, Xu Wei, Nguyen K.T., et al. 2013. Modular in-vivo bioreactor for tissue engineering. Conference: Wound Healing Society Meeting.
32. Carlisle P., Silliman D., Talley A., et al. 2014. Localized Low Dose rhBMP-2 Is Effective at Promoting Bone Regeneration in a Pre-Clinical Mandibular Segmental Defect Model. Conference: TERMIS-AM Conference.
33. Peter Rubin J., Coleman Sydney, Brown Spencer, et al. 2014. Indications and applications of fat grafting for post-traumatic craniofacial deformities: What have we learned and where do we go? Journal of Plastic Reconstructive & Aesthetic Surgery. 67(10): 1460-1461.
34. Chan Rodney K., Aden James, Wu Jesse, et al. 2014. Operative Utilization Following Severe Combat-Related Burns. Journal of Burn Care & Research: Official Publication of the American Burn Association. 36(2).
35. Rettinger Christina L, Fourcaudot Andrea B, Hong Seok J, et al. 2014. In vitro characterization of scaffold-free three-dimensional mesenchymal stem cell aggregates. Cell and Tissue Research. 358(2).
36. Cheng Xingguo, Yoo James J. Hale Robert G. 2014. Biomask for skin regeneration. Regenerative Medicine. 9(3): 245-8.
37. Guda Teja, Labella Carl, Chan Rodney, et al. 2014. Quality of bone healing: Perspectives and assessment techniques. Wound Repair and Regeneration. 22(S1).
38. Johnson Benjamin, Madson Andrew Q., Bong-Thakur, Sarah, et al. 2015. Combat-Related Facial Burns: Analysis of Strategic Pitfalls. Journal of Oral and Maxillofacial Surgery. 73(1): 106-111.
