= Vincent Desportes =

French general and military theorist

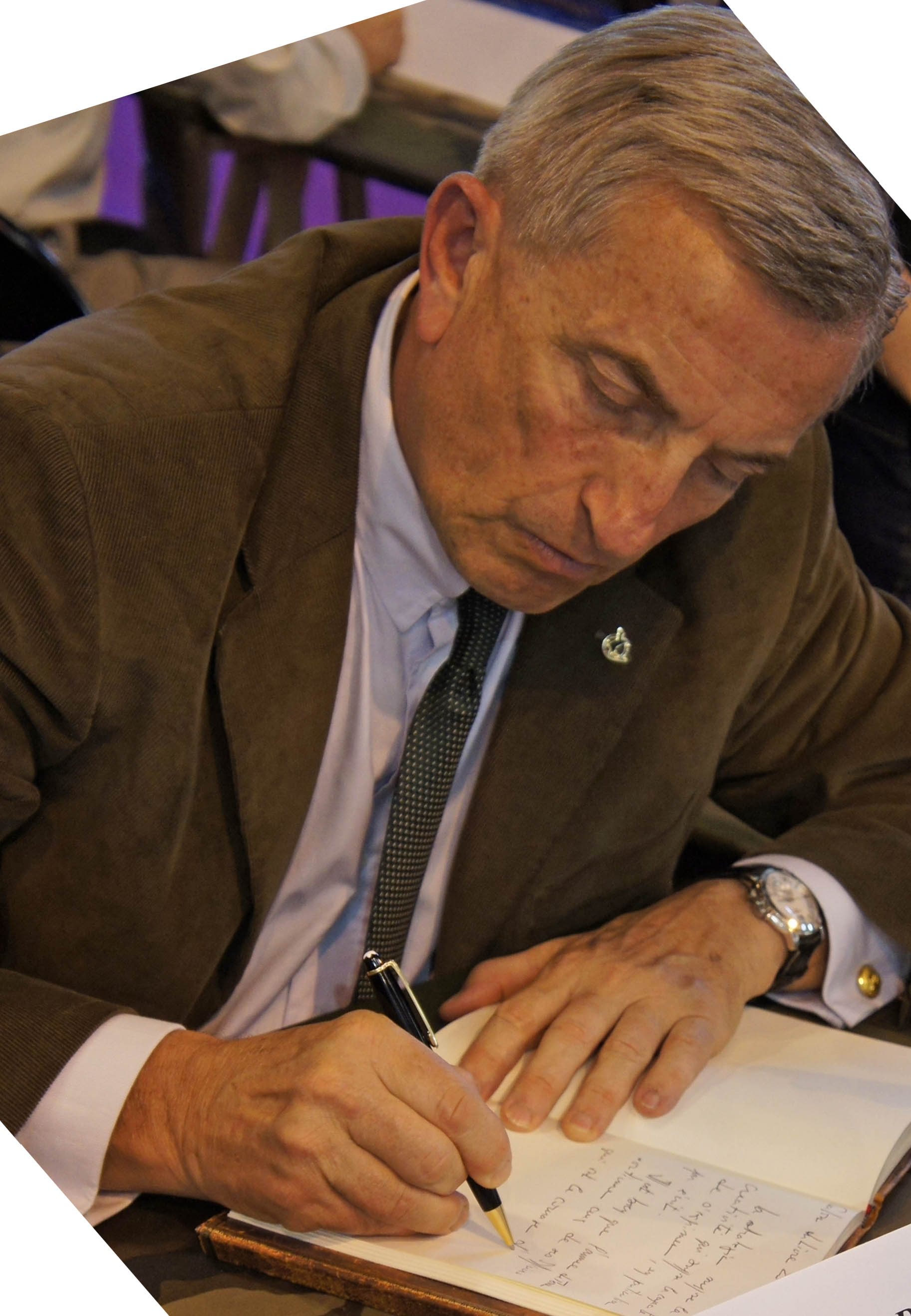
- Vincent Desportes in March 2012
- Born: 24 February 1953 (age 73); Rennes, France
- Allegiance: France
- Branch: French Army
- Service years: 1972 – 2010
- Rank: Général de division
- Commands: Light armoured squadron, 1er régiment de spahis (1981–1983) 501st-503rd Tank Regiment (1996–1998); Centre de doctrine et d'emploi des forces (2005–2008) Collège interarmées de défense (2008)
- Awards: Officer of the Legion of Honour Officer of the National Order of Merit; Knight of the Order of Arts and Literature Badge of Honour of the Bundeswehr (Germany) Officer of the Legion of Merit (USA) Meritorious Service Medal (USA)

Vincent Desportes (born 24 February 1953) is a retired French Army general and military theorist.

Desportes graduated from the École spéciale militaire de Saint-Cyr, specialising in armour warfare. He also holds an engineer's degree, a diplôme d'études approfondies in sociology, an MBA, and graduated from the U.S. Army War College.

He was Military attaché in the French embassy in the USA, aid to the General secretary for national defence, and director of the Centre de doctrine et d'emploi des forces.

Along with Jean-Francois Phelizon, Desportes is co-director of the "Stratégies & Doctrines" collection of Economica editions.

Desportes headed the Collège interarmées de défense in 2008-2010.

== Honours ==
- Officer of the Legion of Honour
- Officer of the National Order of Merit
- Knight of the Order of Arts and Literature
- Badge of Honour of the Bundeswehr (Germany)
- Officer of the Legion of Merit (USA)
- Meritorious Service Medal (USA)

== Works ==
=== Books ===
- Cavalerie de décision, ADDIM, 1998, ISBN 2-907341-84-7
- Comprendre la guerre, Economica, 2000, 2e édition en 2001, ISBN 2-7178-4286-1
  Prix Fréville de l'Académie des Sciences Morales et Politiques
  Prix Vauban de l'Association des Auditeurs de l'IHEDN
- L'Amérique en Armes, Economica, 2002, ISBN 2-7178-4434-1
- Décider dans l'incertitude, Economica, 2004, 2e édition en 2007, ISBN 2-7178-5335-9
  English Translation Deciding in the Dark, Economica, 2008, ISBN 2-7178-5574-2
- Introduction à la Stratégie, Economica, 2007, ISBN 2-7178-5423-1
- La Guerre Probable, Economica, 2007, ISBN 2-7178-5504-1
  Prix de la Saint-Cyrienne 2008
  English Translation Tomorrow’s War , Brookings Institution Press, 2009, ISBN 2-7178-5718-4
- Le piège américain, Pourquoi les États-Unis peuvent perdre les guerres d'aujourd'hui, Economica, 2011, ISBN 978-2717858426
- La dernière bataille de France, Lettre aux Français qui croient encore être défendus, Gallimard, 2015, ISBN 9782070106912

=== Articles ===
- Articles in Défense & Sécurité Internationale
- Articles in Défense et sécurité collective
- Several articles in Doctrine
- Article in Politique Etrangère (journal of the IFRI)
- Interview in Défense et Sécurité internationale (DSI)
- Article in Revue Militaire Suisse
- Interview in DefenseNews
- Interview in Le Monde
- Article in La Tribune
- Interview in Small War Journal
- Entretien in Le Monde 07/02/2010

== Sources ==
- (in French) Ens-Centre de géostratégie
- (in French) Ministry of Defence
- (in French) Biography
