= Peter Zanca =

American physician

Dr. Peter Zanca
- Born: October 29, 1908
- Died: July 31, 1976 (aged 67)
- Branch: United States Army
- Service years: 1938-1963 (USA)
- Rank: Colonel (USA)
- Awards: Legion of Merit, 1955 and Oak Cluster, 1963
- Other work: Professor at University of Texas Medical School at San Antonio

Peter Zanca (October 29, 1908, New York City - July 31, 1976, San Antonio, Texas) was an American physician who served as a medical doctor in the US Army for 25 years, achieving the rank of Colonel, and then served as Professor and founding Chairman of the Department of Radiology for the University of Texas Medical School at San Antonio. Zanca married Helen F. Allen of Roanoke, Virginia in 1938. They had three sons, Joseph H., Peter A., and William S. Zanca. Mrs. Zanca died of leukemia in 1947. Zanca later married Margaret Quaid in 1949 and had two sons, John E. and David G. Zanca.

Zanca was born as the third of seven children to Italian immigrants, Joseph and Josephine (Calavetta) Zanca. He grew up in Little Italy in New York City and graduated from DeWitt Clinton High School. After high school, he attended Washington Square Community College, NYU, 1927–1929 and Long Island University, 1929–1931, where he excelled in a pre-medical study. In 1931, he attended the Medical School at the University of Rome in Italy. In 1935, he returned to the United States and began his 41-year medical career. He interned at St. Joseph's Hospital in Lancaster, Pennsylvania, 1936–1937 and served as a resident of radiation therapy at the American Oncologic Hospital in Philadelphia, Pennsylvania, 1936-37. He joined the US Army Medical Corp in 1938.

As a doctor serving in the US Army, Zanca served in two wars, World War II and the Korean War. He was posted to numerous Army bases around the world. During World War II, he served as assistant radiologist at Fort Bragg Army Hospital in 1942-43, Chief Radiologist in the European Theatre of Operations, 1944–45, the 314th and 136th Station Hospitals. Following the war, Zanca was posted as a physician at West Point in 1945-46, where he also worked as a fellow in radiation therapy at Bellevue Hospital in New York City. From 1947-1950, he was posted as chief of radiology services at William Beaumont General Hospital at Fort Bliss, Texas. To pursue residency in Radiology, he served at Oliver General Hospital in Augusta, Georgia and Letterman Army Hospital in San Francisco, California in 1950. He passed the radiology boards in 1950 and was promoted to Colonel. During the Korean War, he was part of the Far East Command where he served as chief of radiology services at the Osaka and Tokyo Army Hospitals, 1953-1955. Following the Korean War, Zanca was posted to Fort Dix Army Hospital, 1955–58 and Brooke General Hospital at Fort Sam Houston in San Antonio, Texas from 1958-1963. During his Army career he won the Legion of Merit and two Oak Leaf Clusters.

During his tenure with the University of Texas Medical School at San Antonio, he also served as the chair of the department of radiology at the San Antonio Veteran's Administration Hospital, Bexar County Hospital and the Robert B. Green Memorial Hospital.

Zanca was a prolific researcher and author. He authored or contributed to over 75 articles and exhibits in his career and was credited with the discovery of the "Zanca View". The "Zanca View" is a specific technique used to evaluate acromioclavicular joint injuries.

He was a Fellow of the American College of Radiology, member of the American Medical Association; the American Roetgen Ray Society; American Radiological Society; Radiological Society of North America; New York Academy of Science and the Texas Medical Association.

He died of natural causes in San Antonio, Texas.
