= Francis T. Giesler =

American civil engineer and Army officer (1912–1984)

- Born: June 12, 1912; Laramie, Wyoming, United States
- Died: January 18, 1984 (aged 71); Greeley, Colorado, United States
- Spouse: Marie Viola Wapler
- Children: 2
- Military career
- Allegiance: United States
- Branch: United States Army
- Service years: 1942–1946
- Rank: Lieutenant colonel
- Unit: Fifth Army Ordnance Section
- Commands: 236th Ordnance Bomb Disposal Company
- Conflicts: World War II; Italian campaign
- Awards: Legion of Merit

Francis T. Giesler (June 12, 1912 – January 18, 1984) was an American civil engineer and United States Army officer. During World War II, he served in bomb-disposal assignments with the Fifth Army in North Africa and Italy, commanded the 236th Ordnance Bomb Disposal Company, and served as the Fifth Army staff bomb disposal officer. He received the Legion of Merit for his direction of the Fifth Army's bomb disposal operations between December 1943 and December 1944.

== Early life and education ==
Giesler was born on June 12, 1912, in Laramie, Wyoming. He attended Laramie High School and studied engineering at the University of Wyoming. In June 1941, he received a Bachelor of Science degree in civil engineering.

Before entering military service, Giesler worked as the city engineer of Laramie. He was also employed in the office of the area engineer at Fort Francis E. Warren, where he worked in its structural engineering department.

== Military career ==
Giesler entered active duty in the United States Army on March 15, 1942, as a second lieutenant. He was assigned to Army bomb disposal work and subsequently became commander of the 236th Ordnance Bomb Disposal Company, serving with the Fifth Army in North Africa and Italy.

By December 1943, Giesler was a major assigned to the Ordnance Section of Fifth Army headquarters. As the army's staff bomb-disposal officer, he was responsible for coordinating and supervising its bomb disposal activities. His duties included organizing bomb disposal units, monitoring their field operations, developing improvements to disposal procedures, and advising the Fifth Army Ordnance Service on technical matters.

Giesler was awarded the Legion of Merit for exceptionally meritorious service from December 7, 1943, through December 31, 1944.

After returning to the United States, Giesler was transferred to the headquarters of the Fourth Army at Fort Sam Houston, Texas. As the army bomb disposal officer, he supervised its bomb-disposal units and operations. He left active service on June 1, 1946, with the rank of lieutenant colonel.

== Later life ==
Following his military service, Giesler returned to civil engineering in private industry. His postwar work included construction projects in Wyoming, Colorado, and Canada.

Giesler married Marie Viola Wapler on June 12, 1942. They had two children. He died on January 18, 1984, in Greeley, Colorado, at the age of 71.
