= Amaro Soares Bittencourt =

Brazilian major general (1885–1963)

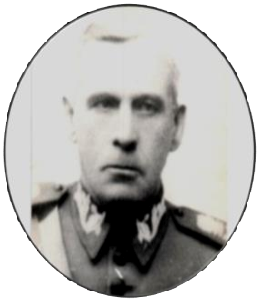
- Born: 1885
- Died: 1963 (aged 77–78)
- Allegiance: Brazil
- Branch: Brazilian Army

Amaro Soares Bittencourt (1885–1963) was a diplomat, a military and civil engineer and a general officer of the Brazilian Army, who attained the Brazilian Army rank of General of Division or in its original Portuguese "General de Divisão" (the equivalent U.S. Army rank is Lieutenant General). During the Second World War, then Brazilian “General de Brigada” (Brigadier General) Bittencourt was the chief of the Brazilian military mission to the United States, that is the military attaché at the Brazilian Embassy in Washington, D.C., and a member of the Brazilian delegation to the Inter-American Defense Board. In October 1942, he became the first recipient of the United States Legion of Merit (Commander). France awarded Bittencourt the Legion of Honor (Officer) for his wartime service, and Brazil awarded him the Order of Military Merit ( Ordem do Mérito Militar). The Major General was a graduate of Brazil’s Escola Militar and its Escola de Estado-Maior.

In Brazil itself, where the military played a significant role in civilian infrastructure development and administration, the Lieutenant General with Brazilian Admiral Ary Parreiras led in a civilian capacity the Special Commission on Steel of Brazil’s Federal Technical and Financial Council. Most significantly, in 1939 this commission created a controversy when it voted to make Brazil’s ore exports a state monopoly as a precondition to the nation’s founding of a state steelworks. The government of Brazil did not ultimately follow the commission's recommendation.

== See also ==
- Recipients of the Legion of Merit
- Brazilian Expeditionary Force
- Joint Brazil-US Defense Commission
