= Legion of Merit =

Military award of the US Armed Forces

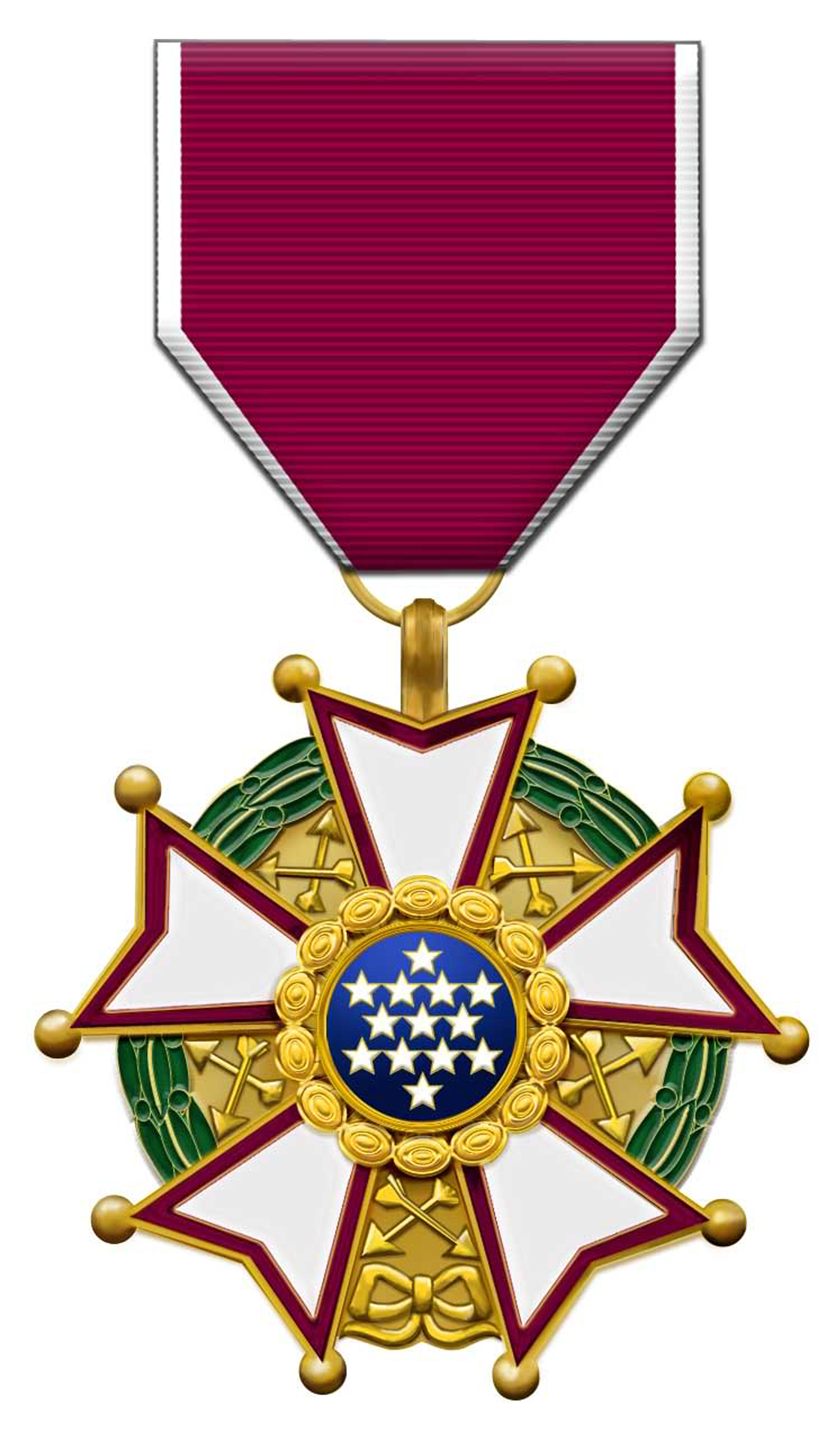
- Type: Military medal Order of merit
- Awarded for: “Exceptionally meritorious conduct in the performance of outstanding services and achievements”
- Presented by: United States Department of the Army; United States Department of the Navy; United States Department of the Air Force; United States Department of Homeland Security
- Eligibility: Members of the Uniformed Services of the United States and political and military leaders of allied states
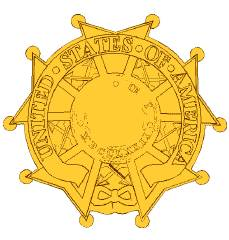
- Reverse
- Status: Currently awarded
- First award: 1942
- Service ribbon

Precedence
- Next (higher): Defense Superior Service Medal
- Next (lower): Distinguished Flying Cross

The Legion of Merit (LOM) is a military award of the United States Armed Forces which is given for exceptionally meritorious conduct in the performance of outstanding services and achievements. The decoration is issued to members of the eight uniformed services of the United States as well as to military and political figures of foreign governments.

The Legion of Merit (Commander degree) is one of only two United States military decorations to be issued as a neck order (the other being the Medal of Honor), and the only United States military decoration that may be issued in degrees (much like an order of chivalry or certain orders of merit), although the degrees including a neck ribbon are only awarded to non-U.S. nationals.

The Legion of Merit is seventh in the order of precedence of all U.S. military awards and is worn after the Defense Superior Service Medal and before the Distinguished Flying Cross. In contemporary use in the U.S. Armed Forces, the Legion of Merit is typically awarded to Army, Marine Corps, Air Force, and Space Force general officers and colonels, and Navy and Coast Guard flag officers and captains occupying senior command or very senior staff positions in their respective services. It may also be awarded to officers of lesser rank, senior warrant officers (typically in command positions at the rank of chief warrant officer 5), and to very senior enlisted personnel (typically in the rank of command sergeant major and Sergeant Major of the Army in the Army, fleet master chief petty officer and Master Chief Petty Officer of the Navy in the Navy, command chief master sergeant and Chief Master Sergeant of the Air Force in the Air Force, command chief master sergeant and Chief Master Sergeant of the Space Force in the Space Force, and Sergeant Major of the Marine Corps in the Marine Corps), but these instances are less frequent, typically by exception, and the circumstances vary by branch of service.

Authority to award the Legion of Merit is reserved for general officers and flag officers in pay grade O-9 (i.e., lieutenant general, vice admiral) and above, civilian Department of Defense personnel at assistant service secretary or Assistant Secretary of Defense level and above, or equivalent secretary-level civilian personnel with the Department of Homeland Security with direct oversight of the U.S. Coast Guard.

== Criteria ==
The degrees of Chief Commander, Commander, Officer, and Legionnaire are awarded only to members of armed forces of foreign nations under the criteria outlined in Army Regulation 672-7 and is based on the relative rank or position of the recipient as follows:

1. Chief Commander: Head of state or government. However, this degree was awarded by President Roosevelt to some Allied World War II theater commanders, usually for joint amphibious landings or invasions. (The President had this power under Executive Order 9260 of October 29, 1942, paragraph 3b.)
2. Commander: Equivalent of a U.S. military chief of staff or higher position, but not to a head of state.
3. Officer: General or flag officer below the equivalent of a U.S. military chief of staff; colonel or equivalent rank (e.g., Navy or Coast Guard captain) for service in assignments equivalent to those normally held by a general or flag officer in U.S. military service; or military attachés.
4. Legionnaire: All recipients not included above.

When the Legion of Merit is awarded to members of the uniformed services of the United States, it is awarded without reference to degree. The criteria are "for exceptionally meritorious conduct in the performance of outstanding services and achievements" and is typically reserved for senior officers at O-6 level and above, typically in connection with senior leadership/command positions or other senior positions of significant responsibility.

- The performance must have been such as to merit recognition of key individuals for service rendered in a clearly exceptional manner.
- Performance of duties normal to the grade, branch, specialty, or assignment, and experience of an individual are not an adequate basis for this award.
- For service not related to actual war, the term "key individual" applies to a narrower range of positions than in time of war and requires evidence of significant achievement.
- In peacetime, service should be in the nature of a special requirement or of an extremely difficult duty performed in an unprecedented and clearly exceptional manner.
- However, justification of the award may accrue by virtue of exceptionally meritorious service in a succession of important positions.

The degrees and the design of the decoration were influenced by the French Legion of Honour (Légion d'honneur).

== History ==
Legion of Merit with golden "V" device (as used by USN and USMC) denoting combat bravery. The "V" device ceased being awarded with the Legion of Merit in 2017.

=== World War II ===
Although recommendations for the creation of a medal for meritorious service were initiated as early as September 1937, no formal action was taken toward approval.

In a letter to the Quartermaster General (QMG) dated December 24, 1941, the Adjutant General formally requested that action be initiated to create a meritorious service medal and provide designs in the event the decoration was established. Proposed designs prepared by Bailey Banks and Biddle and the Office of the Quartermaster General were provided to the Assistant Chief of Staff for Personnel (Colonel Heard) by the QMG on January 5, 1942.

The Assistant Chief of Staff (G-1), Brigadier General John H. Hilldring, in a response to the QMG on April 3, 1942, indicated the Secretary of War had approved the design recommended by the QMG. The design of the Legion of Merit (change of name) would be ready for issue immediately after legislation authorizing it was enacted into law. (A separate medal called the Meritorious Service Medal was established in 1969.)

An act of Congress (Public Law 671, 77th Congress, Chapter 508, 2d Session) on July 20, 1942, established the Legion of Merit and provided that the medal "shall have suitable appurtenances and devices and not more than four degrees, and which the President, under such rules and regulations as he shall prescribe, may award to

(a) personnel of the Armed Forces of the United States and of the Government of the Commonwealth of the Philippines and
(b) personnel of the armed forces of friendly foreign nations who, since the proclamation of an emergency by the President on 1939-09-08, shall have distinguished themselves by exceptionally meritorious conduct in the performance of outstanding services."

The medal was announced in War Department Bulletin No. 40, dated August 5, 1942. Executive Order 9260, dated October 29, 1942, by President Franklin D. Roosevelt, established the rules for the Legion of Merit, and required the President's approval for the award.

Following the invasion of North Africa in November 1942, several United States officers were awarded the Legion of Merit in the degree of Officer. One of the recipients was future Chairman of the Joint Chiefs of Staff Lyman Lemnitzer. Soon after, regulations for the award of the Legion of Merit were revised so that it would not be awarded in the degrees above Legionnaire to United States military personnel.

The Legion of Merit is similar to the French Legion of Honor in both its design, a five-armed cross, and in that it is awarded in multiple degrees. Unlike the Legion of Honor, however, the Legion of Merit is only awarded to military personnel. In addition, it is the only award in the world that offers multiple degrees, of which the higher degrees cannot be awarded to citizens of the country of origin.

In October 1942, Brazilian Army Brigadier General Amaro Soares Bittencourt became the first person awarded the Legion of Merit (Commander) and a week later, Lieutenant, junior grade Ann A. Bernatitus, a U.S. Navy Nurse Corps officer, became the first member of the United States Armed Forces and the first woman to receive the Legion of Merit. She received the award for her service during the defense of the Philippines. LTJG Bernatitus was also the first recipient of the Legion of Merit authorized to wear a Combat "V" with the medal.

General Dwight D. Eisenhower was presented the Legion of Merit by President Roosevelt while he was en route to the Tehran Conference, in Cairo, Egypt, on November 26, 1943.

In 1943, at the request of the Army Chief of Staff, General George C. Marshall, approval authority for U.S. personnel was delegated to the Department of War. Executive Order 10600, dated March 15, 1955, by President Dwight D. Eisenhower, again revised approval authority. Current provisions are contained in Title 10, United States Code 1121. As a result, awarding authority for the Legion of Merit resides with general officers/flag officers at the Lieutenant General / Vice Admiral level or higher.

The U.S. Navy, Marine Corps, and Coast Guard, unlike the Army and later the Air Force, provided for the Legion of Merit to be awarded with a "V" device indicating awards for participation in combat operations.

From 1942 to 1944, the Legion of Merit was awarded for a fairly wide range of achievements. This was because it was, until the establishment of the Bronze Star Medal in 1944, the only decoration below the Silver Star which could be awarded for combat valor, and the only decoration below the Distinguished Service Medal which could be awarded for meritorious noncombat service.

=== After World War II ===
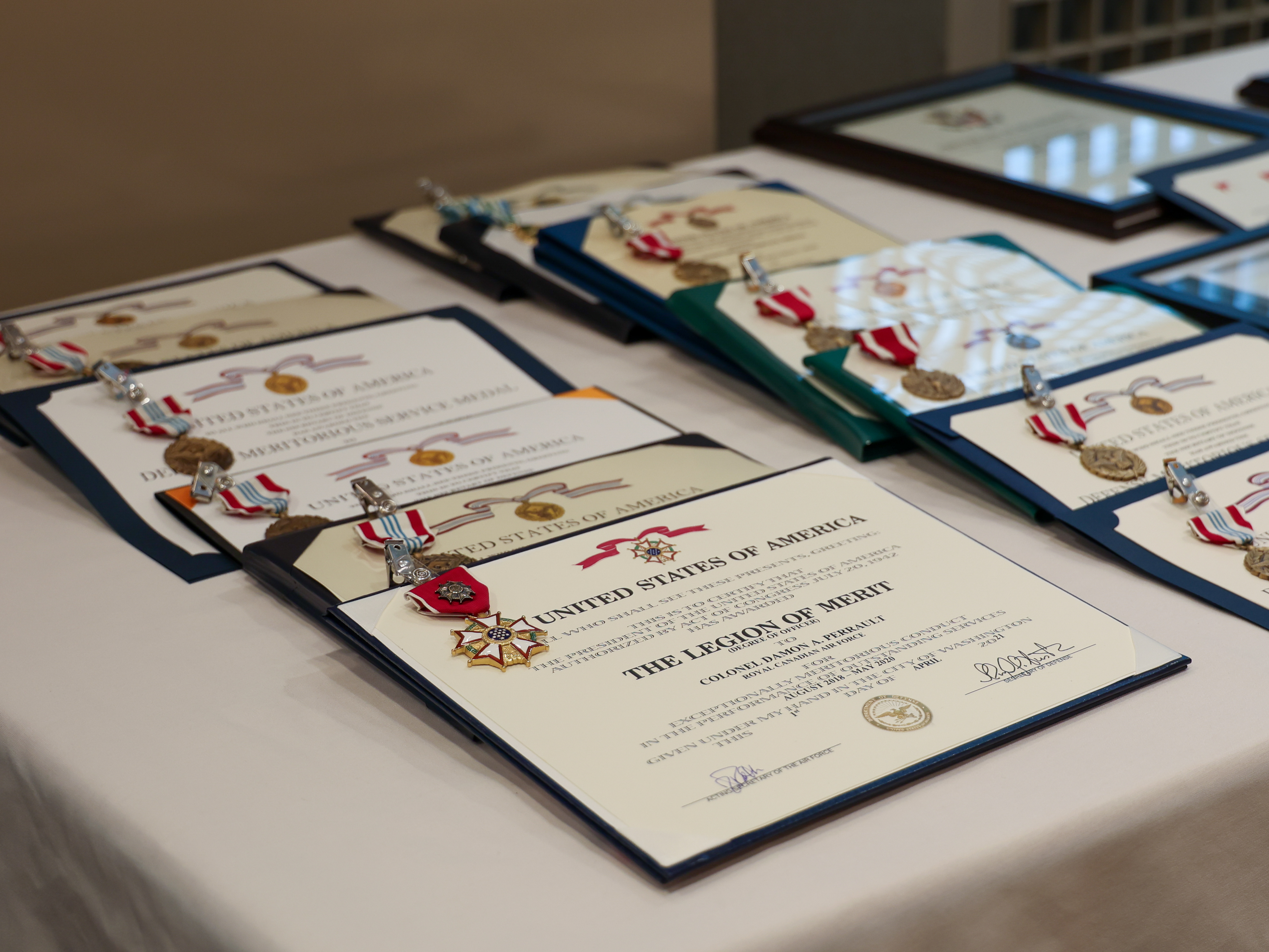
Legion of Merit award certificates

After the establishment of the Bronze Star Medal (BSM) in February 1944, the Legion of Merit was awarded almost exclusively to senior officers in the rank of lieutenant colonel (Army, Marine Corps, and Air Force) or commander (Navy and Coast Guard) (O-5), and above. Beginning in the 1980s, the Legion of Merit was awarded more frequently to senior-ranking warrant officers (W-4 and W-5) and to senior enlisted service members (E-8 and E-9), usually as a retirement award. When not awarded as a retirement award, it is most commonly awarded to officers in pay grade O-6 and higher.

The Meritorious Service Medal (MSM) was established in 1969 as a "junior" version of the Legion of Merit and, before 2003, was awarded only for noncombat service. The MSM is awarded more frequently, and to more lower-ranking military personnel, than the Legion of Merit. Recipients of the MSM are usually in pay grades E-7 through E-9, W-3 through W-5 (Army Only), and O-4 through O-6 for the Army, Air Force, and Space Force; for the Navy, Marine Corps, and Coast Guard, the MSM is usually awarded to those in pay grades E-9, W-4, W-5, O-5, and O-6.

== Insignia ==
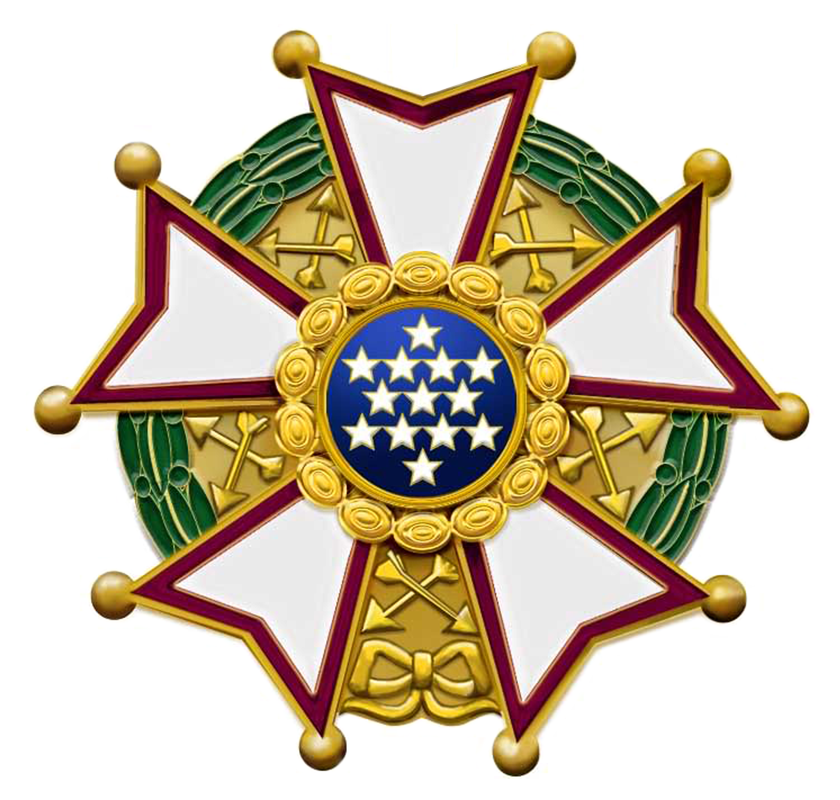
Chief Commander

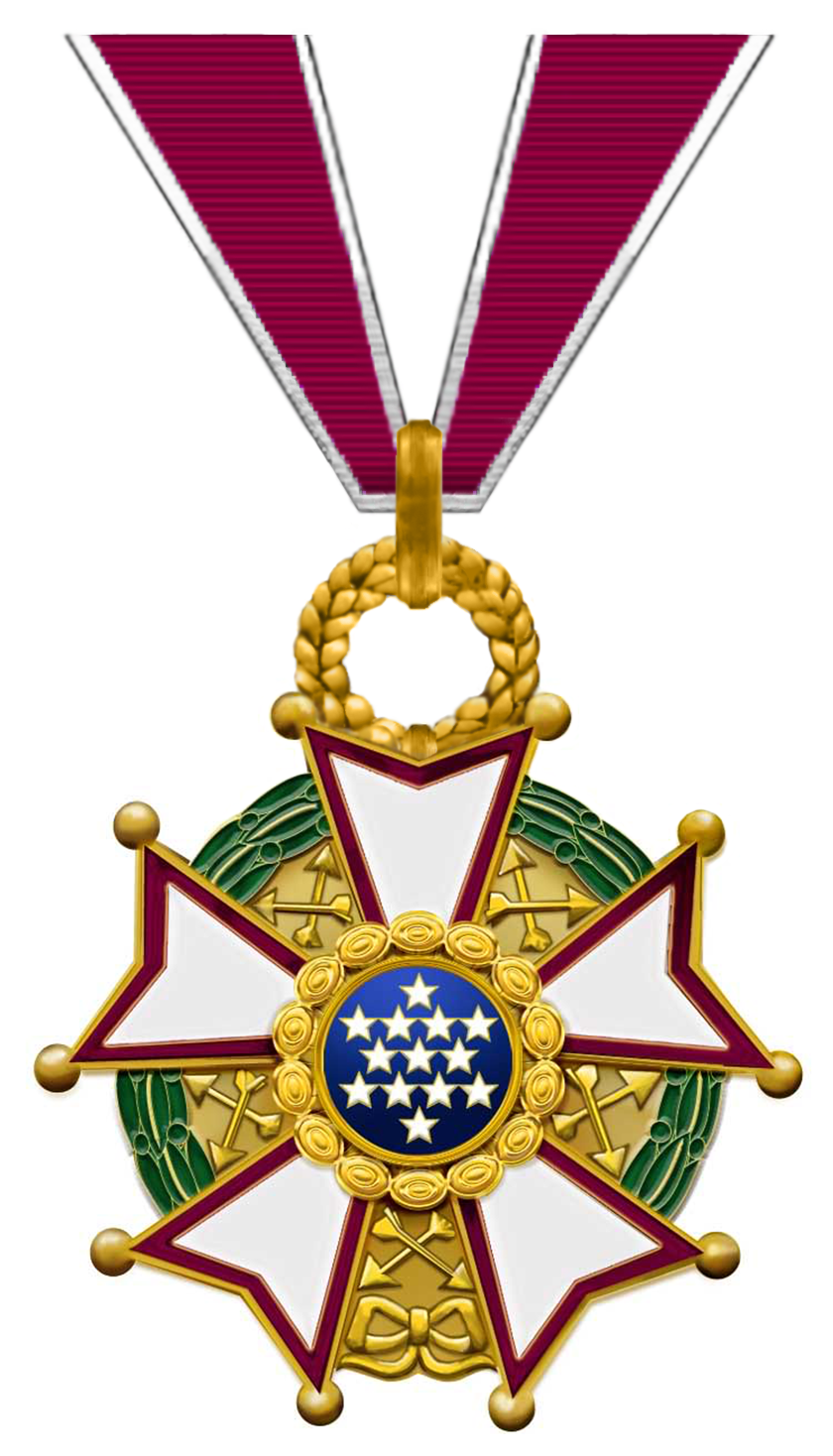
Commander

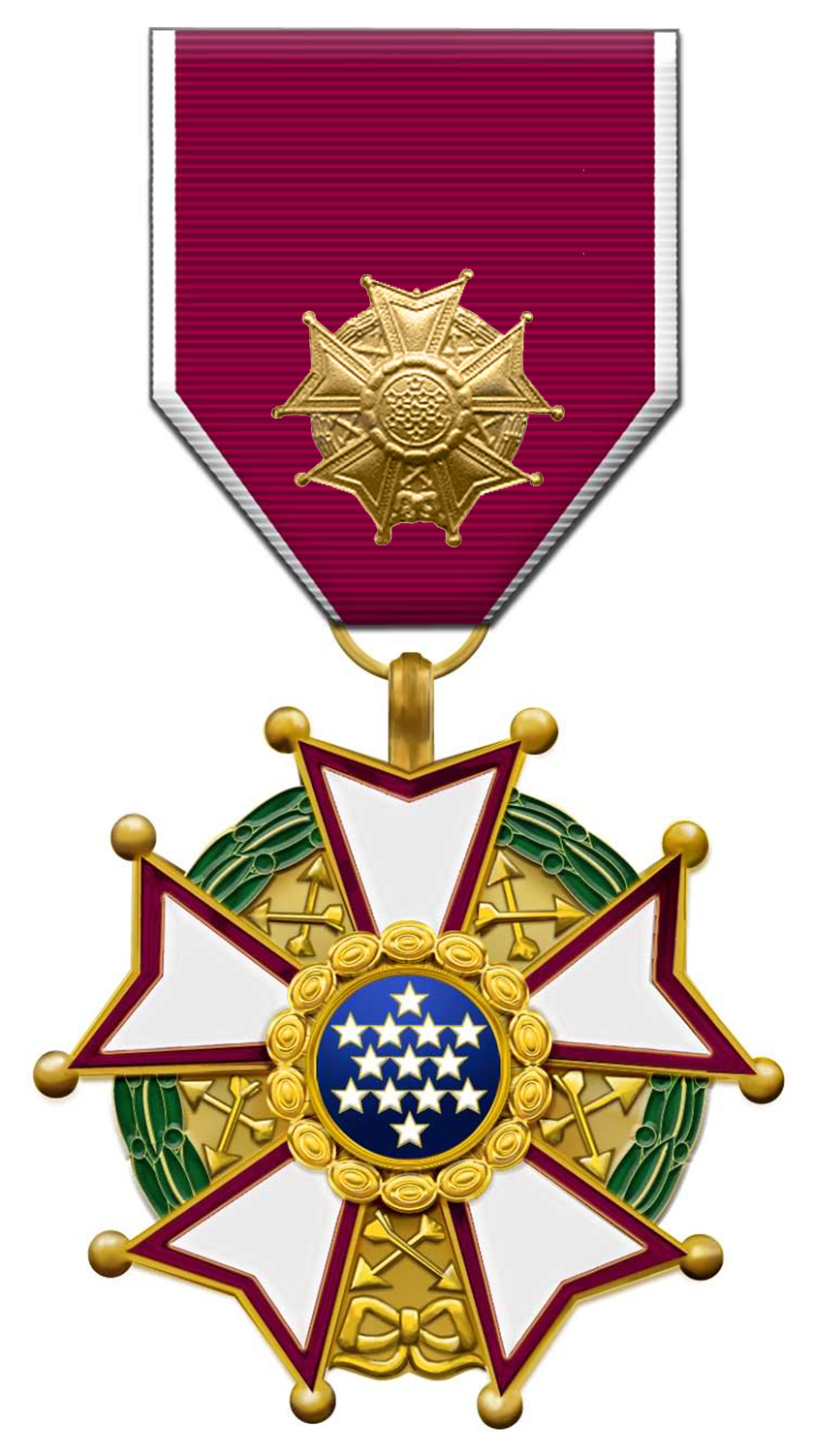
Officer

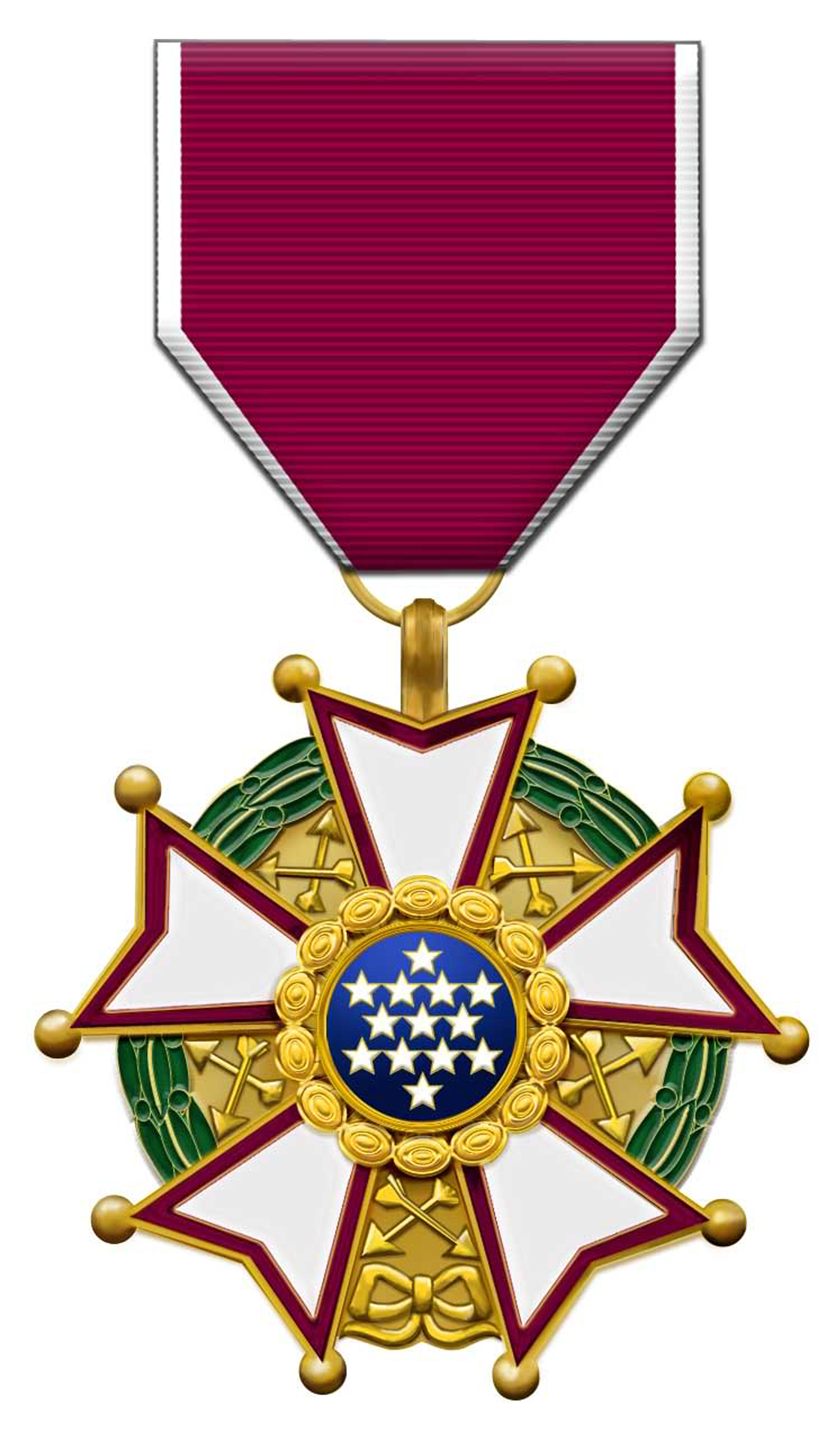
Legionnaire

Ribbon

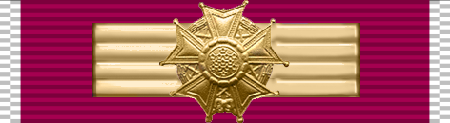

- The Chief Commander Degree of the Legion of Merit Medal is, on a wreath of green laurel joined at the bottom by a gold bow-knot (rosette), a domed five-pointed white star bordered crimson, points reversed with v-shaped extremities tipped with a gold ball. In the center, a blue disk encircled by gold clouds, with 13 white stars arranged in the pattern that appears on the Great Seal of the United States. Between each point, within the wreath, are crossed arrows pointing outwards. The overall width is 2 15/16 inches (75 mm). The words "UNITED STATES OF AMERICA" are engraved in the center of the reverse. A miniature of the decoration in gold on a horizontal gold bar is worn on the service ribbon.
- The Commander Degree of the Legion of Merit Medal is, on a wreath of green laurel joined at the bottom by a gold bow-knot (rosette), a five-pointed white star bordered crimson, points reversed with v-shaped extremities tipped with a gold ball. In the center, a blue disk encircled by gold clouds, with 13 white stars arranged in the pattern that appears on the Great Seal of the United States. Between each star point, within the wreath, are crossed war arrows pointing outwards, representing armed protection to the Nation. The overall width is 2 1/4 inches (57 mm). A gold laurel wreath in the V-shaped angle at the top connects an oval suspension ring to the neck ribbon that is 1 15/16 inches (49 mm) in width. The reverse of the five-pointed star is enameled in white, and the border is crimson. In the center, a disk for engraving the name of the recipient surrounded by the words "ANNUIT COEPTIS MDCCLXXXII": a combination of the motto from the Great Seal, "He [God] Has Favored Our Undertakings", with the date for the first award of a US decoration, the Purple Heart. An outer scroll contains the words "UNITED STATES OF AMERICA." A miniature of the decoration in silver is worn on a horizontal silver bar on the service ribbon.

The neck ribbon for the degree of Commander is 1 15/16 inches (49 mm) wide and consists of the following stripes: 1/16 inch (1.6 mm) white 67101; center 1 13/16 inches (46 mm) crimson and 1/16 inch (1.6 mm) white.

- The Officer Degree of the Legion of Merit Medal is similar to the degree of Commander except the overall width is 1 7/8 inches (48 mm) and the pendant has a suspension ring instead of the wreath for attaching the ribbon. A gold replica of the medal, 3/4 inch (19 mm) wide, is centered on the suspension ribbon.
- The Legionnaire Degree of the Legion of Merit Medal and the Legion of Merit Medal issued to U.S. personnel is the same as the degree of Officer, except the suspension ribbon does not have the medal replica.

The ribbon for all of the decorations is 1 3/8 inches (35 mm) wide and consists of the following stripes: 1/16 inch (1.6 mm) white; center 1 1/4 inches (32 mm) crimson; and 1/16 inch (1.6 mm) white. The reverse of all of the medals has the motto taken from the Great Seal of the United States, "ANNUIT COEPTIS" ("He [God] has favored our undertakings") and the date "MDCCLXXXII" (1782), which is the date of America's first decoration, the Badge of Military Merit, now known as the Purple Heart. The ribbon design also follows the pattern of the Purple Heart ribbon.

Additional awards

Additional awards of the Legion of Merit are denoted by oak leaf clusters (in the Army, Air Force, and Space Force), and by 5/16 inch (7.9 mm) gold stars (in the Navy, Marine Corps, Coast Guard, NOAA Commissioned Corps, and USPHS Commissioned Corps). Until 2017, the sea services (the Navy, Marine Corps, and Coast Guard) awarded the Combat "V" for wear on the LOM. The Army, Air Force, and Space Force do not authorize the "V" device for the Legion of Merit.

== See also ==
- Recipients of the Legion of Merit
