= First National Jamboree =

Quadrennial event organized by the Boy Scouts of America

- Black & White version of the 1937 Jamboree Logo
- Location: Washington, D.C.
- Country: United-States
- Coordinates: 38°53′21.89″N 77°2′19.46″W
- Camp size: 350 acres
- Affiliation: Boy Scouts of America

The First National Jamboree of the Boy Scouts of America took place in 1937. Originally scheduled to take place in 1935 to celebrate their silver jubilee, an outbreak of polio in Washington, D.C. and the neighboring states, caused it to be canceled and pushed back, finally taking place from June 30 to July 9, 1937. Twenty-five thousand scouts attended the event taking place on the National Mall at the foot of the Washington Monument using equipment loaned by the United States Army. Scouts from all around the United States arrived by train, while representatives of several foreign countries' scouting groups traveled by boat and even by foot. The event was celebrated by the entire city with Federal buildings being opened for visits, Mount Vernon offering daily visits, and many local residents volunteering their time. U.S. President Roosevelt took part in the celebration and a special message from Lord Baden-Powell was broadcast from London to the scouts during the jamboree calling for International Friendship. It was a display of American patriotism with American flags on display; the event took place in the American capital in front of the White House during the week of the 4th of July.

== Background ==
=== Cancellation of 1935 event ===
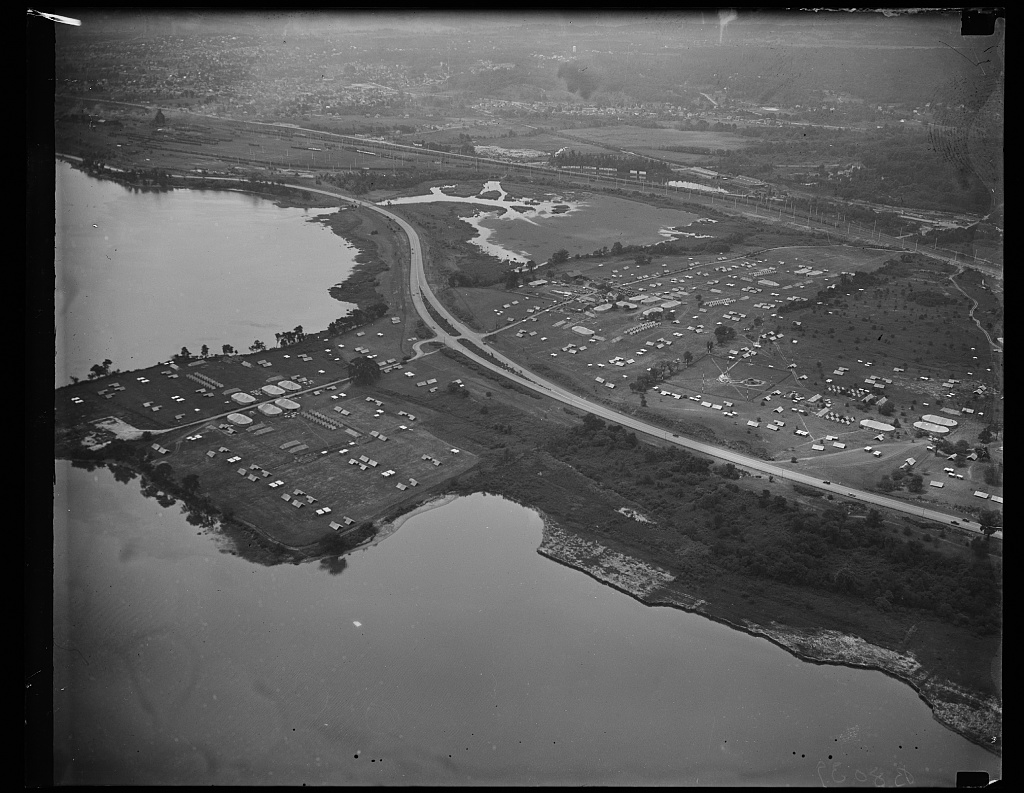
Deserted Jamboree camp on the mall taken on August 9, 1935, following the cancelation of the event by President Roosevelt

In 1935, a Jamboree was scheduled to take place from August 21 to August 30, 1935, in Washington, DC. 25,000 scouts were expected to attend. However, the area was seeing an increase in cases of "Infantile paralysis" (Polio) with 20 new cases reported in Virginia on July 31, 1935. Federal and State officials gathered to evaluate the situation and decide whether to cancel the Jamboree. It is finally decided that the event should be canceled to protect the health of the scouts. By then preparations for the events were well on the way and it was not until August 8, 1935, that they halted by President Roosevelt. A year's postponement was called for rather than a cancellation. The President had personally been affected by Polio 14 years earlier. The cost of the event for 1935 was estimated to be $650,000 and would be covered by insurance, including refunding the scouts their $25. However, many scouts from overseas were already on their way. The disassembling of the 1400 tents already set up would be overseen by the US Army who had loaned the tents left over from World War I. In the end, the insurance paid $250,000 to the National Council to be used for the next Jamboree.

=== Radio address by President Roosevelt ===
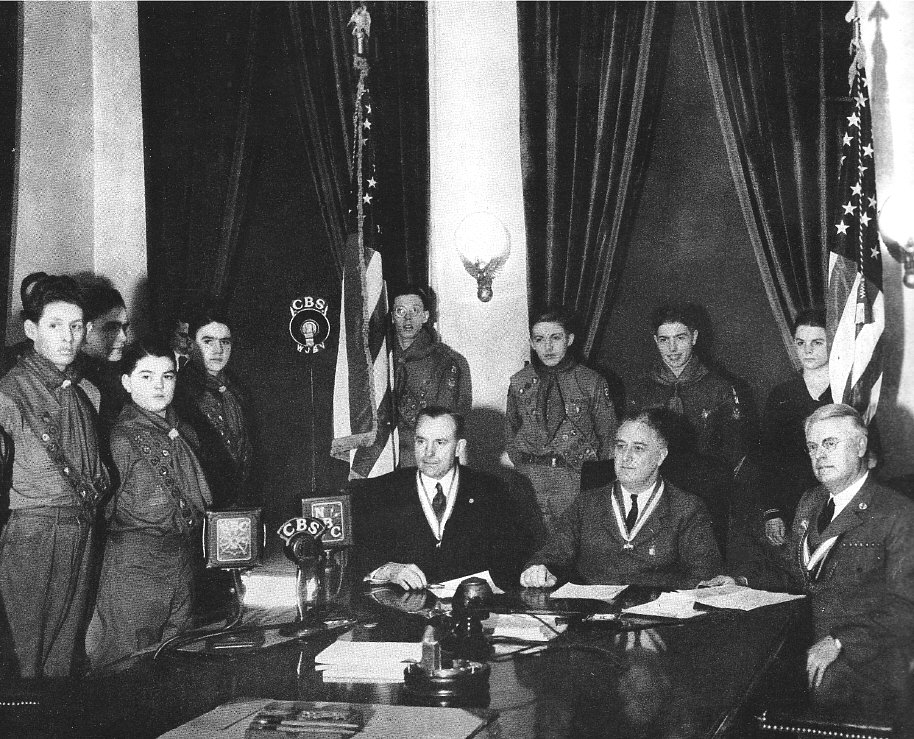
President Roosevelt in a national radio address for the 1937 national Scout jamboree

On February 8, 1936, President Roosevelt made a radio address to the Boy Scouts promoting scouting and appealing to older scouts. At the end of his message, he announced that the jamboree would take place in the early summer of 1937.

=== Breakfast with Congressional leaders ===
Ahead of the First National Jamboree, a breakfast took place on May 21, 1937, at the Senate restaurant gathering Senators and Representatives along with Boy Scout leaders.

In attendance were:

- Sol Bloom, Representative from New York
- William Gibbs McAdoo, Senator of California and honorary vice-president of the Boy Scouts of America
- William B. Bankhead, Speaker of the House
- Daniel C. Roper, Secretary of Commerce
- James E. West, head of the Boy Scouts in the District
- Colin H. Livingstone, first President of the Boy Scouts of America

All in attendance were or had been associated with the Boy Scouts of America. Speeches were made on the importance of scouting and the scout salute was made next to official Jamboree poster.

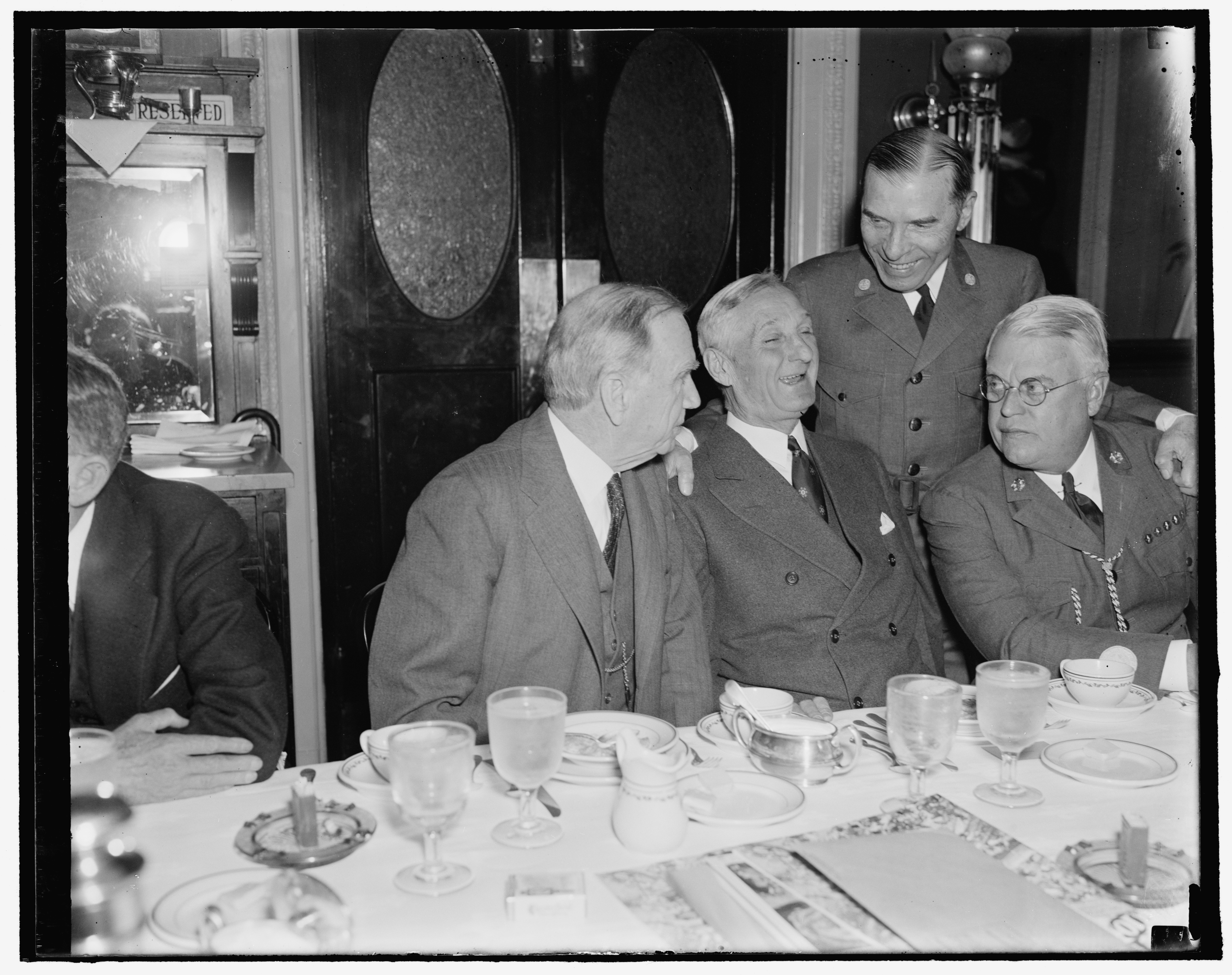
Former Boy Scouts get together. Washington, D.C., May 21. Boy Scouts of yesteryear, whose path led to the Nation's legislative halls, got together this morning for an old-fashioned breakfast of ham and eggs, the breakfast was held at the Senate restaurant, the occasion of the breakfast was a discussion of the Boy Scout Jamboree to be held in Washington, left to right: Sec. of Commerce Daniel Roper; Sen. William Gibbs McAdoo, D. of Calif.; James L. West, Pres. of the National Boy Scouts; and standing is Rep. Sol Bloom, New York

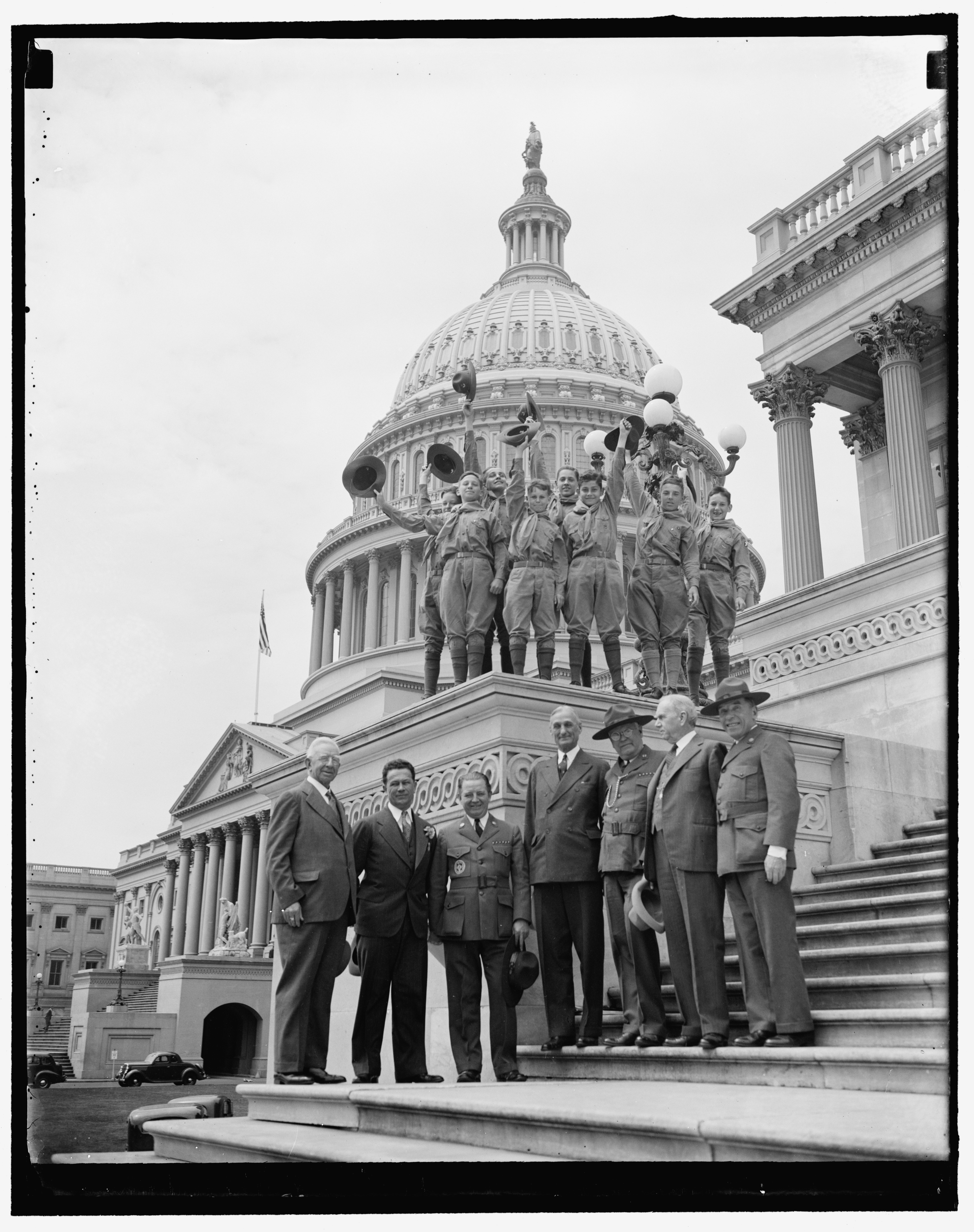
May 21, 1937 - Left to right: Colin H. Livingstone, Sen. A.J. Ellender, Harvey Gordon, William G. McAdoo, James E. West, and Dan Roper

=== Official poster ===
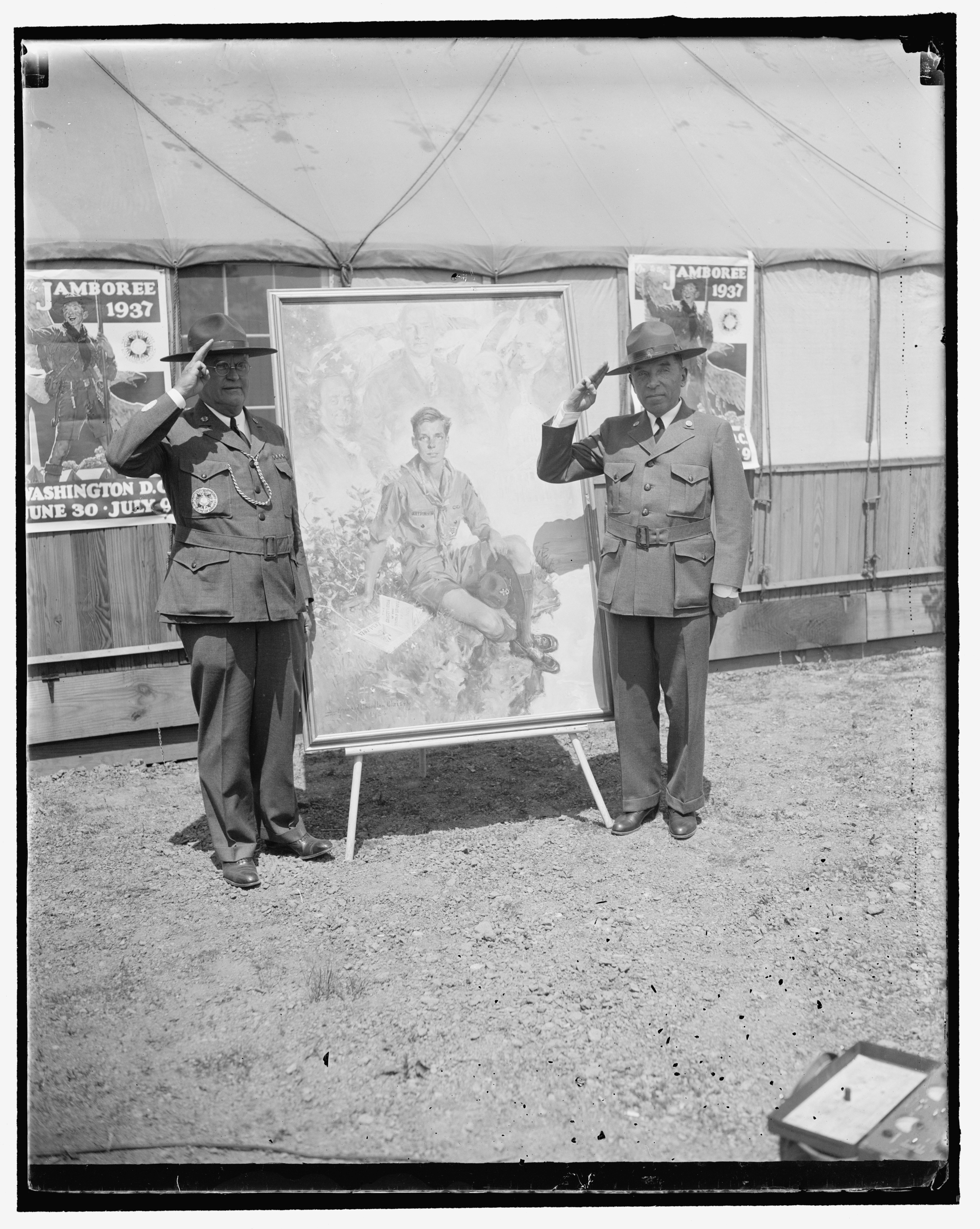
July 1937 - James E. West and Rep. Sol Bloom stand next to the official Jamboree poster painted by Howard Chandler Christy.

The Lithography by Howard Chandler Christy which would be used as the Jamboree Poster was presented in May 1937. The poster featured a Boy Scout in a brown uniform with a yellow neckerchief with his hat in his left hand sitting on grass at the edge of a cliff. Behind were the founding fathers with George Washington's hand on the boy's right shoulder along with the United States Capitol. Behind them all was a flying American flag. Next to the Scout is an open book with "1787-1937" written on the left page and "The Constitution of the United States of America" written on the right page.

== 1937 First National Jamboree ==
The first national jamboree was held on the National Mall in Washington, D.C. occupying 350 acres for ten days from June 30 to July 9, 1937, attended by 25,000 Scouts. Region campsites were set up around the Washington Monument and Tidal Basin.

=== Logistics ===
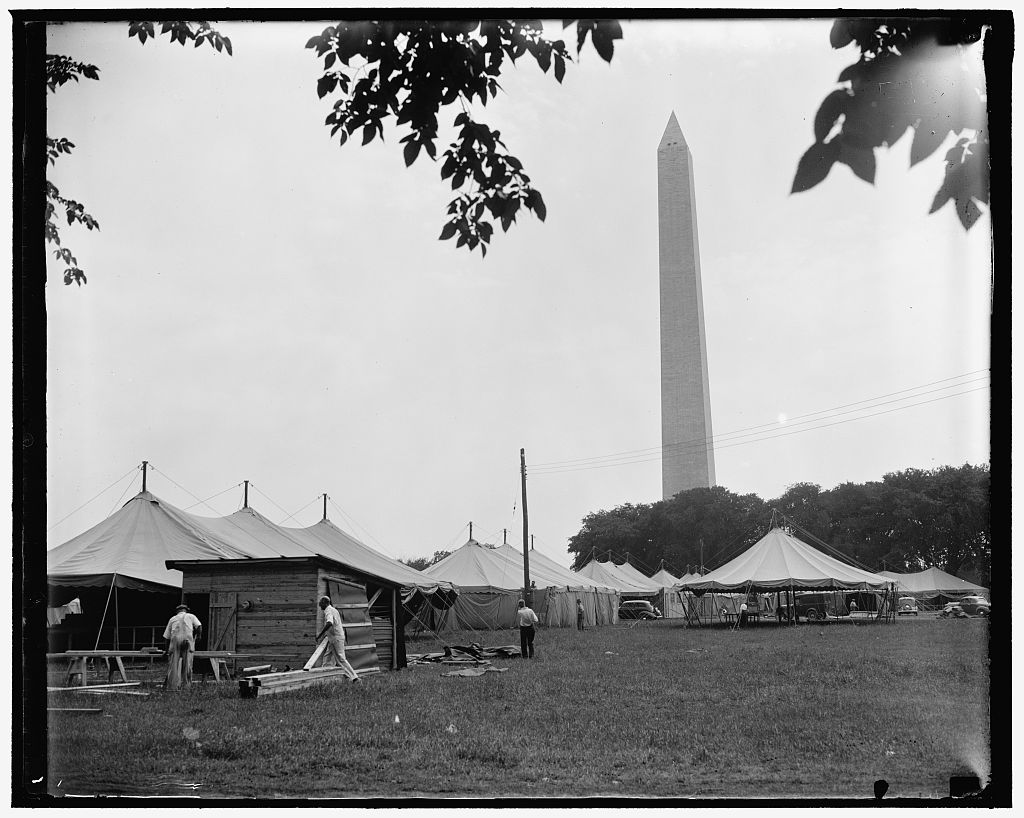
Preparation for the 1937 Jamboree

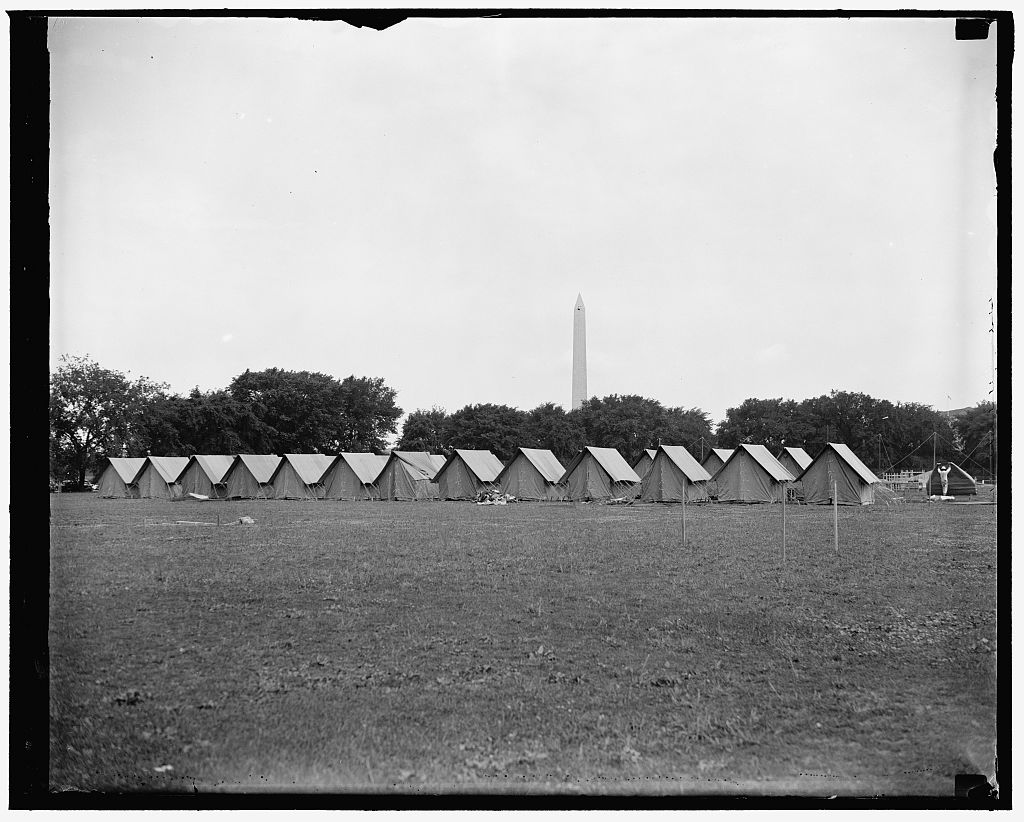
Row of tents in front of the Washington Memorial

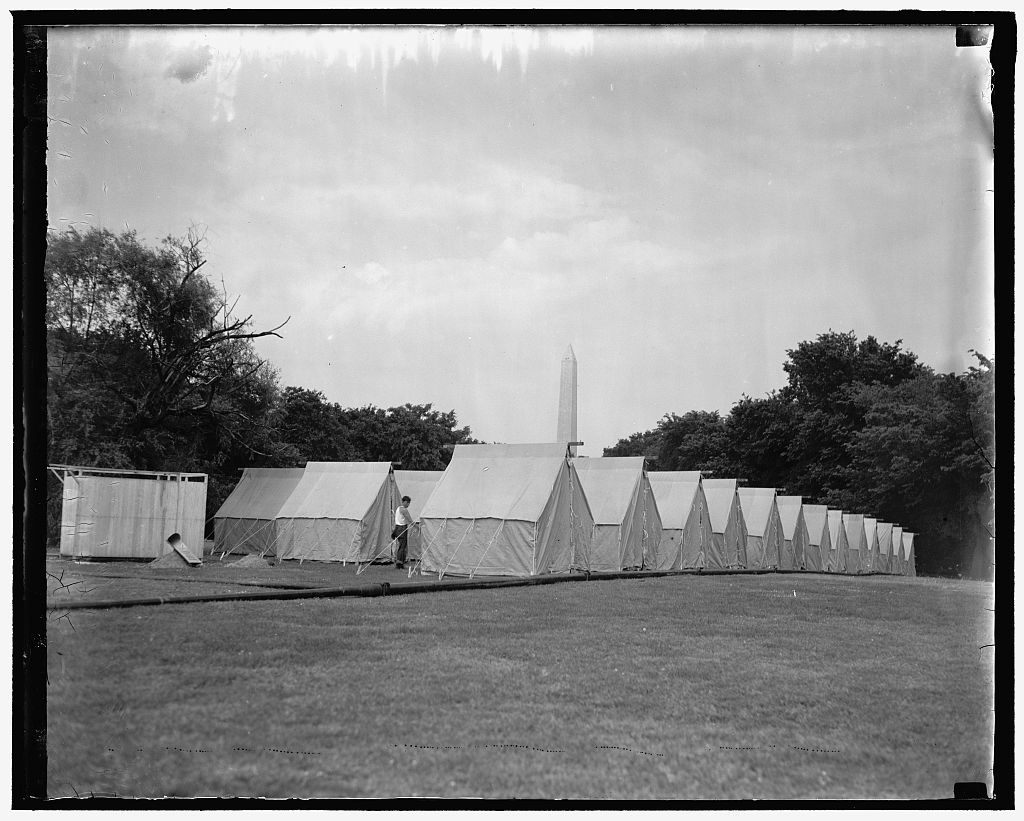
The tents on the Mall for the 25,000 Scouts who attended the Jamboree

Most arrived by train coming in Union Station. Most of the railroads had agreed to reduce their fares to 1 cent per mile in coach for scouts and their leaders when traveling in parties of 10 or more. An additional 25 cents would be charged to transport their camp gear several city blocks from the train station to the Mall. On June 29 alone, 64 special trains arrived in the city just for the Jamboree. The first group of 5,000 Scouts mostly from Delaware, Maryland, Virginia and the District of Columbia arrived on June 26. The last group arrived in the evening of June 29 from Santa Rosa, California.

The US Army provided most of the equipment for the Jamboree:

- 3,901 tents (1,835 16x16 "pyram" tents, 1,800 small 9x9, 140 16x50, 30 14x14 usually used by Army Chaplains and 126 40x80)
- 400 mattresses
- 20,000 cots
- 20,000 bed sacks
- 16,000 blankets
- 29,000 canteens,
- 195 Army field ranges
- 125 flags
- 9,000 meat platters
- 1,600 rakes
- 3,200 shovels
- 1,000 hand axes
- 854 sterilizing bags
- 40 field telephone unites
- 900 coffee pots
- 1,632 of each for butcher knives, cook spoons and meat forks
- 13,000 serving spoons

If the tents were placed end to end, it would cover one square mile. The Boy Scouts of America were to return everything at the end of the Jamboree and would cover any damage to the equipment. The equipment was sourced from Army posts in a 100-mile radius of Washington, D.C. as well as from Columbus, Ohio, New York City and Philadelphia

To feed the scouts and their leaders, 25 kitchens were set up on the Jamboree grounds. From there, the 816 provisional troops would get their food and take them back to their troop dining tents in thermos cans. It was estimated that 250 tons of food would be consumed daily including 900 bushels of potatoes, 13,000 pounds of bread, 50,000 eggs and 1,200 gallons of canned vegetables would be used at each meal. 25,000 quarts of milk would be drunk while 4,000 pounds of butter would be consumed daily. According to an advertisement by Melvin Ice Cream in the local newspaper, 1,071 gallons of their ice cream were served at each meal, representing 30,000 service a day. In total, 100,000 meals were served every day served on paper plates. Each scout was responsible for bringing and cleaning their own silverware.

There were two shower houses with 18 large high-powered sprays for every group of 1,250 boys.

Five theater tents were set up for Scout talent shows. On the first day of the Jamboree, 25 campfires were set up.

75 doctors, 75 male hospital assistants, and 3 dentists volunteered their time for the Jamboree to men the 20 stations on-site to treat cuts, bruises, cases of sunburns and do a few teeth extractions. One hundred beds were reserved for the occasion at the Marine Hospital and two American Red Cross ambulances were on duty 24/7 in case of sickness or accident. The fear of polio that had led to the cancellation of the 1935 Jamboree was still present.

=== Personal communications ===
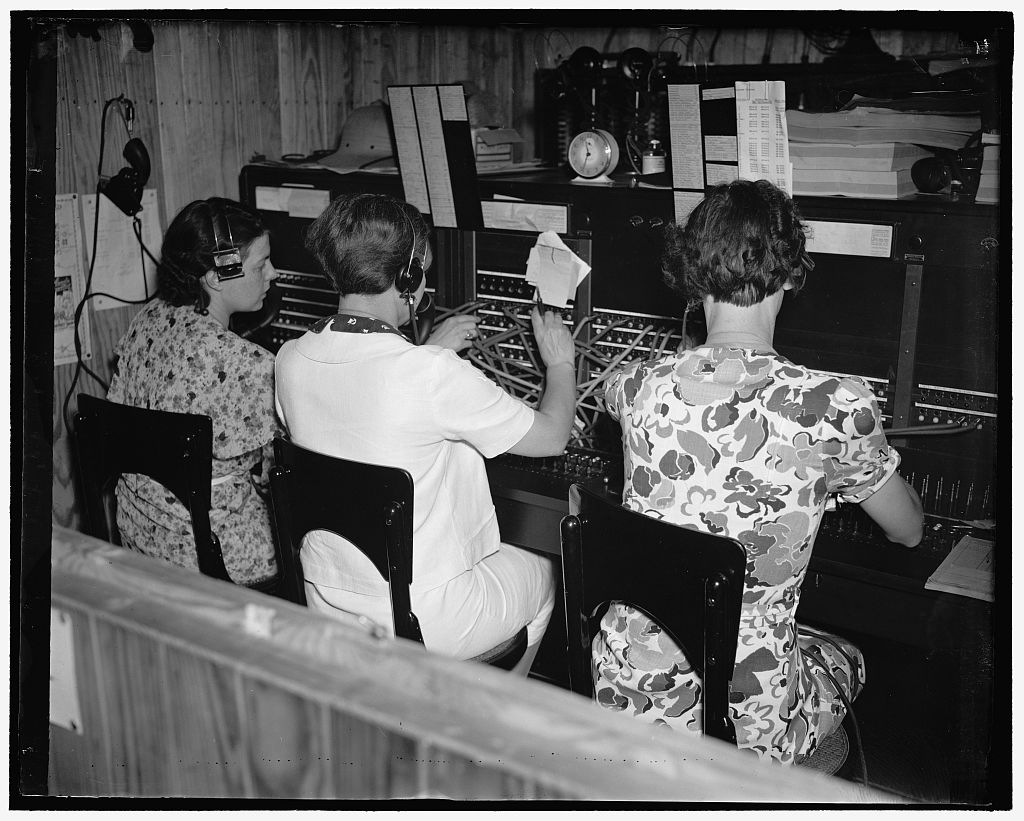
Three operators working shifts of three each on duty day and night for the phones

Telephones and two telegraphs were set up on the grounds so parents could easily reach their children.

The Washington Post Office handled thousands of extra pieces of mail a day from the Scouts and their parents. This was the most mail they had encountered for any convention. A Camp Post Office was set up with branches in every section of the camp. Several mail trucks were called every day. Valley Forge Council used three homing pigeon on three separate journeys to send messages from the Jamboree to Norristown, Pennsylvania, taking only 3 hours and each time the birds were returned to camp by train in the custody of a Pigeon fancier.

=== News coverage ===
The event was covered extensively by radio and newspapers. A press tent accommodated 526 news media reporters, photographers, and broadcasters. Sixty-four news releases were issued and the BSA assisted in the making of 11 newsreels and 53 magazine articles.

20 telephones and 2 telegraph services were set up in the tent to share the news with the nation and the world. A Mimeograph allowed handouts to be printed handouts which would be sent to the National Press Club, 1,950 daily newspapers and 12,000 country weeklies. Special writers and their photographers were present for various magazines including The Saturday Evening Post, Time, Life and Fortune.

The three major U.S. radio networks of the time, NBC, CBS, and Mutual, had broadcasting studios near the jamboree headquarters to produce almost 19 hours of live, on-site jamboree coverage broadcast coast-to-coast. Celebrities also visited the jamboree, including well-known broadcaster Lowell Thomas and U.S. President Franklin D. Roosevelt. While at the jamboree, Scouts also attended a three-game baseball series between the Washington Senators and the Boston Red Sox at Griffith Stadium, as well as toured nearby Mount Vernon.

On July 7, "Canning" started to take place. Short programs were recorded by foreign Scouts by the United States Recording Company to be sent home for rebroadcasting. Indeed, it had become impossible to handle all the live requests.

Hometown newspapers across the United States had "Boy Scout correspondents" at the Jamboree. Over 100 Scout journalists and some of the leaders had their travel expenses paid in exchange for daily stories sent by telegraph or air mail. These young journalists had official press credentials from the Jamboree public relations services.

The scouts had their own official Boy Scouts of America daily morning newspaper for the time of the event called the Jamboree Journal. It was to be a 16-page illustrated tabloid with a circulation of 50,000 copies with a circulation staff of older scouts distributing the edition to 20 sectional camps of 1,260 scouts and leaders each. The additional thousands of copies were to be mailed to subscribers and sold in Washington, D.C.

=== Camp organization ===
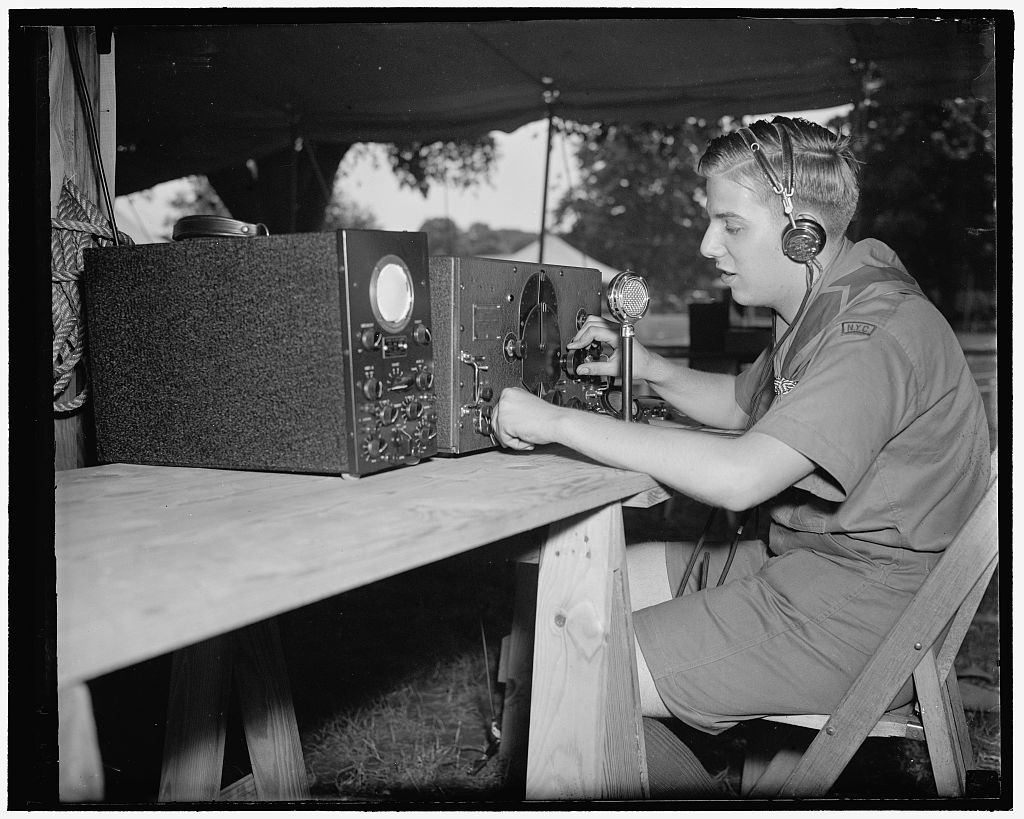
Larry Le Kashman, of New York City, with the short-wave radio sending and receiving set loaned to the Boy Scouts for their National Jamboree in Washington. A special license was issued by Federal Communications Commissions for the set, which will carry no commercial programs but will be used to carry news of the Jamboree to Scouts throughout the world who were unable to make the trip to Washington on June 26, 1937

"General headquarters" tents were set up in a quadrangle near the Washington Monument with offices for the Jamboree adult leadership. The headquarters also included:

- the Jamboree Journal tent
- a broadcasting studio
- an auditorium
- a telegraph office
- a trading post
- a store
- the Boys' Life office
- the four theaters
- a dispensary
- a stationery store
- a reception tent
- a Shortwave radio headquarters

Dan Beard, founding member of the Boy Scouts of America, had his tent near the headquarters along with the special camp for the 18,000 Eagle Scouts.

=== Scout safety and discipline ===
Upon arrival at the Jamboree City, each Boy Scout was registered at camp headquarters after presenting credentials. Roll calls were performed every morning and evening as part of the camp routine to keep track of the boys.

34 troops constituted a section. Each section was made of Scouts from all 12 Scout "regions" of the United States. The Scout Patrol method was used under the supervision of the adult leaders. Each tent was occupied by 3 to 9 boys. The boys were responsible for their troop camp.

A service troop of 36 men policed the area occupied by each group of 1,250 boys day and night. In addition, a Traffic Crew was appointed to control traffic in the camp. Composed of 720 older Scouts and adult leaders, it was organized from each of the 20 sections. A "roving squad" partnered with the United States Park Police for night duties. The members of the Traffic Crew were identified by their red and blue neckerchiefs. When on duty, the red neckerchief was worn, while the blue was worn outside the camp with permission.

Curfew was set at 10:00 pm. The Troops devised their own punishments for the offending members. Scouts who were late for the curfew had to report to one of the 1,000 orderlies patrolling the camp at night. Failure to show a pass or provide a satisfactory explanation landed the Scout to be interviewed by the Scoutmaster.

Prior to leaving for Washington, DC, Scouts had been briefed at home that individual misconduct would reflect negatively on their home State and the Boy Scouts of America organization. A strict ban was in place regarding knives and ax blades left in an exposed position. Scouts were expected to make their beds each morning and to police the tent. Any sign of untidiness was to be punished by the Troop.

The Scouts were forbidden to swim in the Potomac River flowing by the camp by the Jamboree officials. This was due to the high level of pollution that prevented safe bathing. Any Scout caught swimming was to be sent back home immediately.

=== Local guides ===
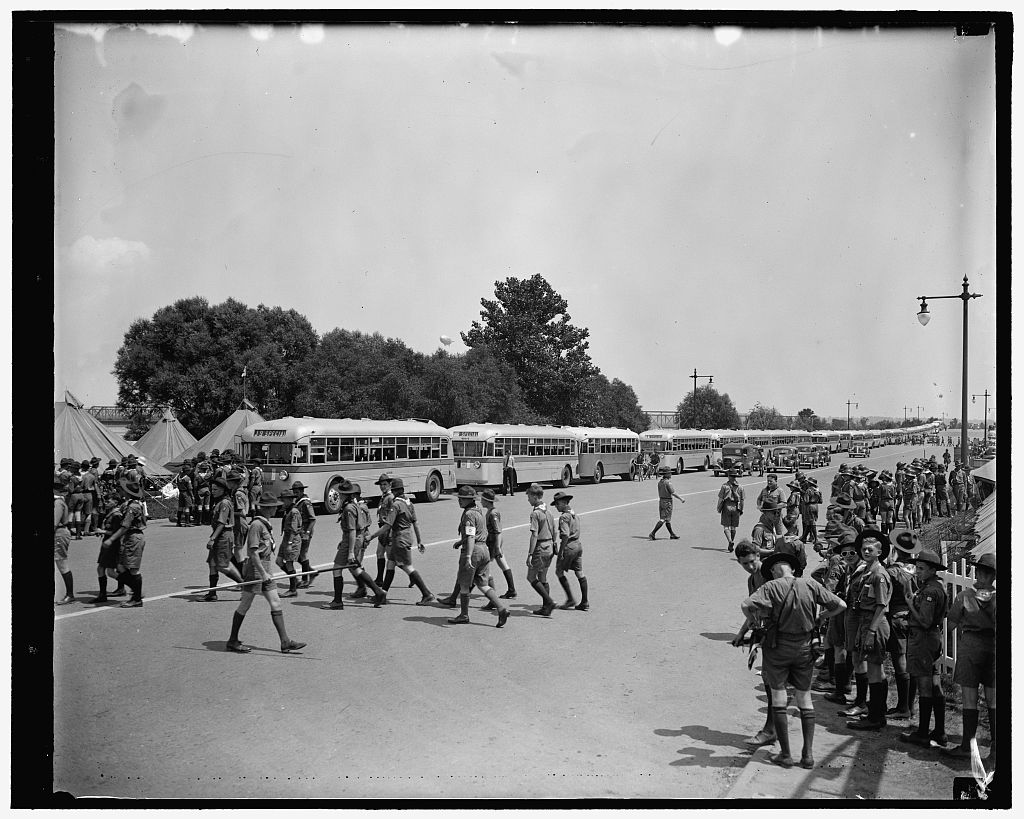
Boy Scouts sightseeing on the Capitol transit buses

1,300 Washington Boy Scouts were trained to act as guides for the out-of-town visitors as they visited the local Government buildings and local attractions. They wore their scout uniforms along with a yellow and blue neckerchief labeled "Jamboree Guide". Requirements to be a guide included "active membership in a troop, the ability to talk, and a good knowledge of Washington". By the end of the Jamboree, they conducted approximately 4,800 tours through Arlington, downtown DC, and Capitol Hill. Each guide was assigned to each troop of 36 visiting Scouts. They worked morning and afternoon shifts.

There were four main guide stations:

- Arlington
- 17th Street NW and Constitution Avenue NW
- The Lincoln Memorial
- Capitol Hill

== Schedule and events ==
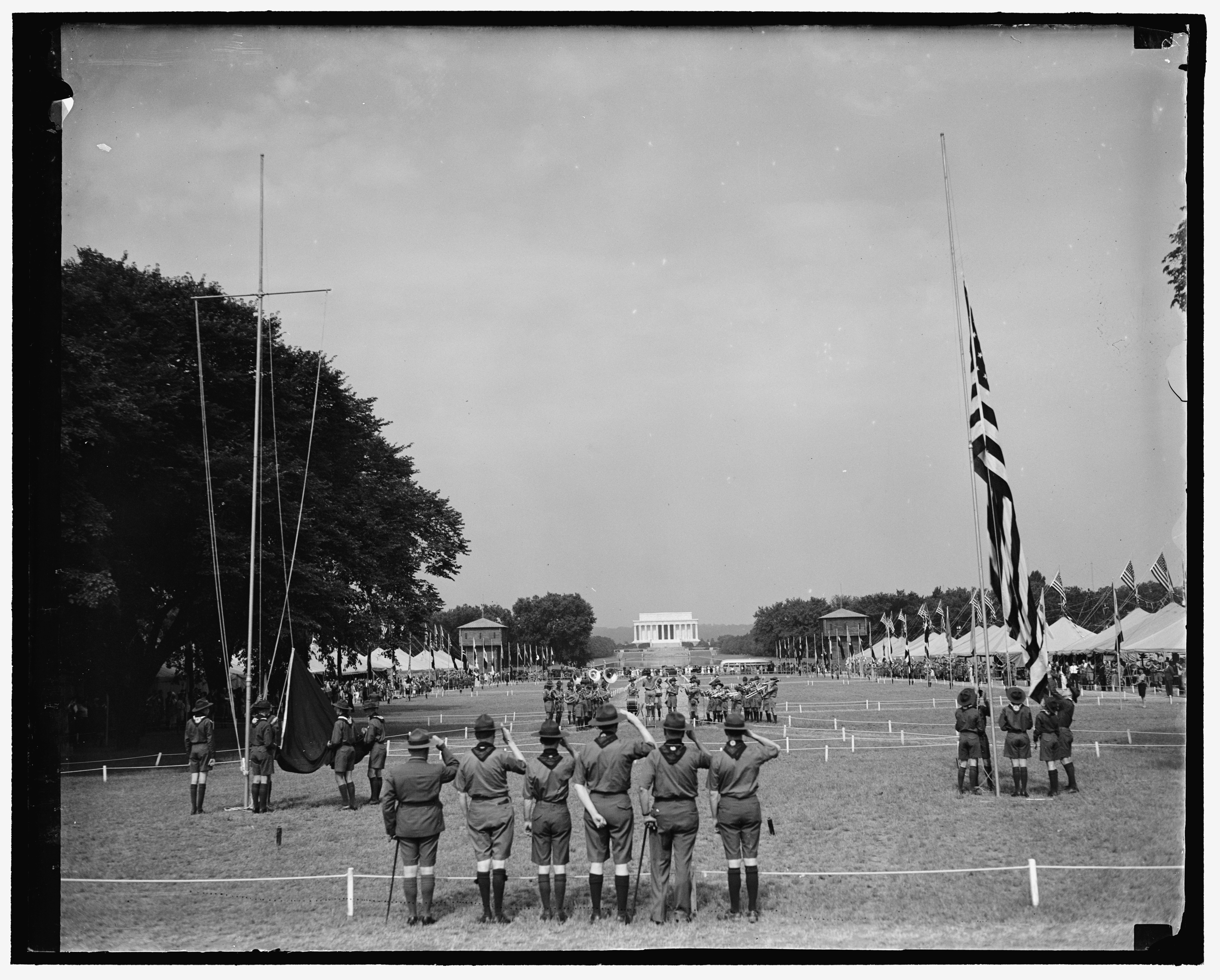
Opening of the first National Scout Jamboree, on the Mall in Washington, D.C., June 30, 1937

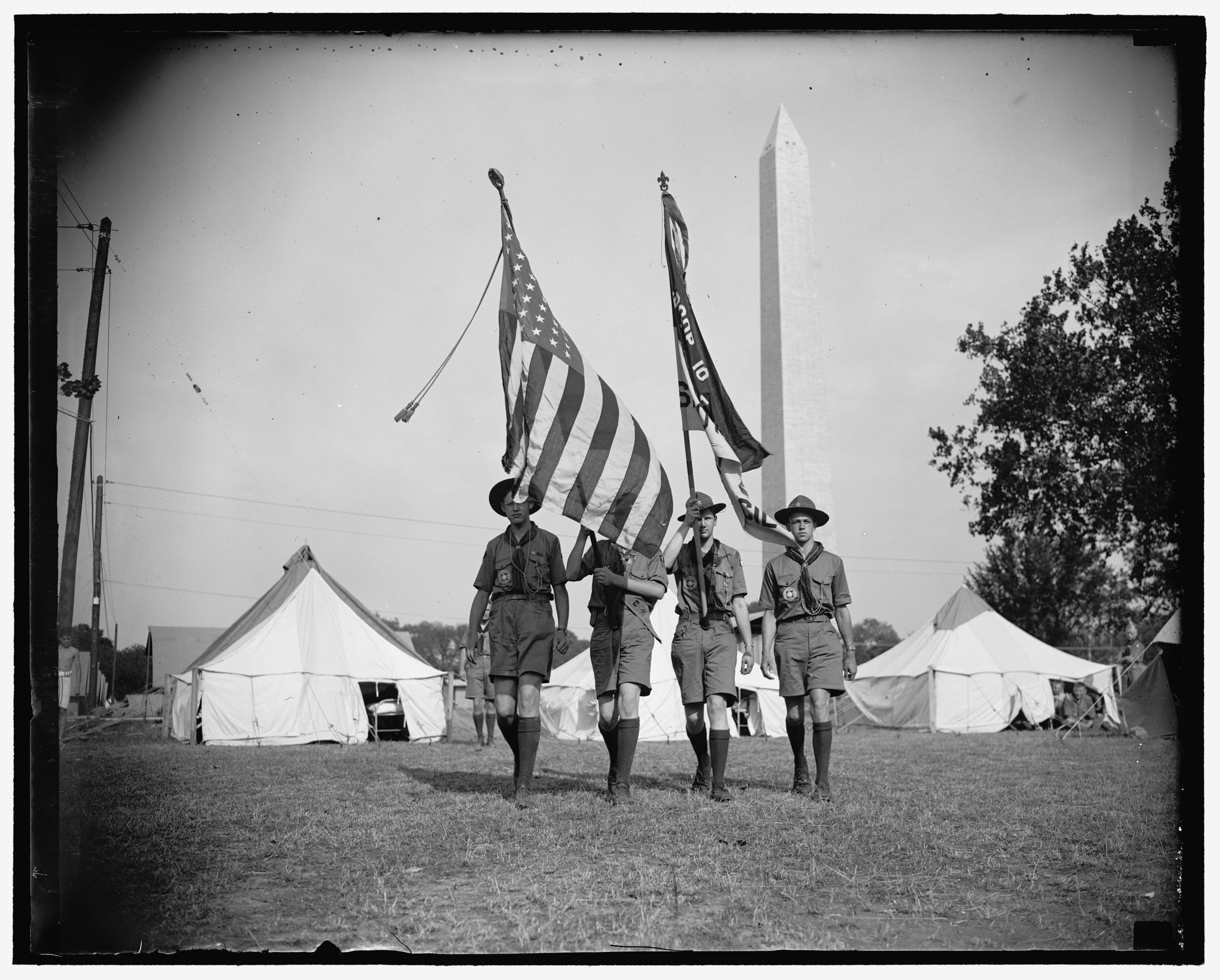
Flag ceremony in front of the Washington Monument

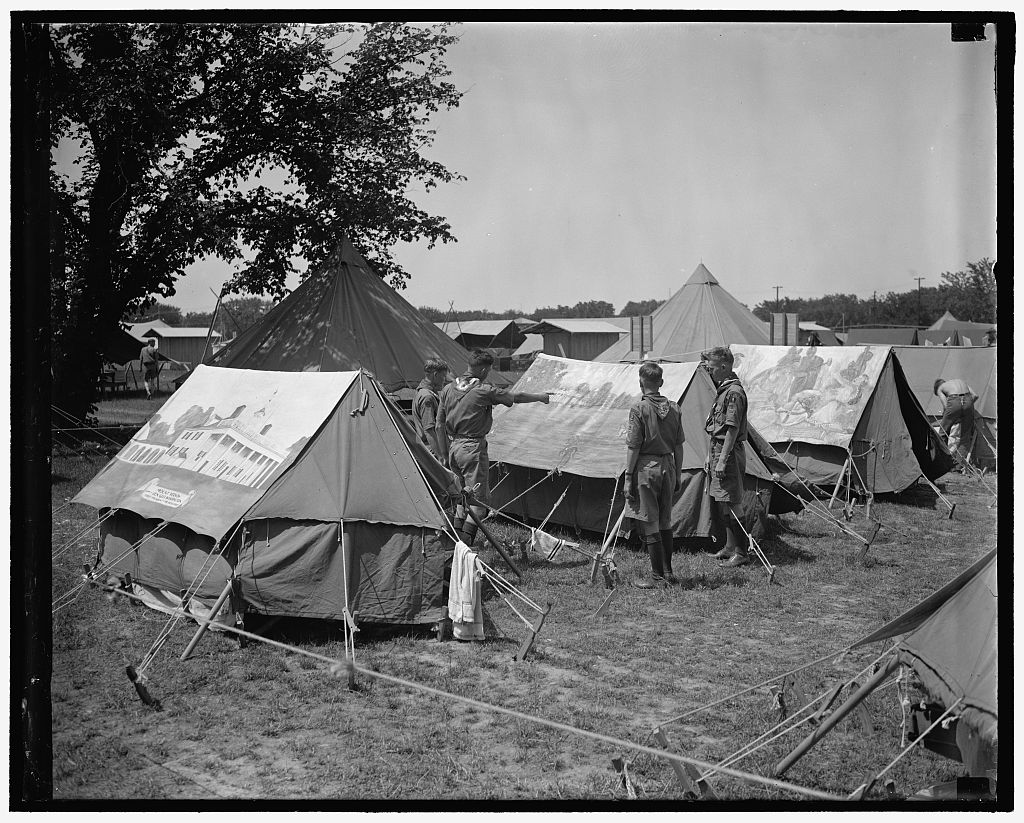
Decorated tents with pictures featuring Mount Vernon on the first one

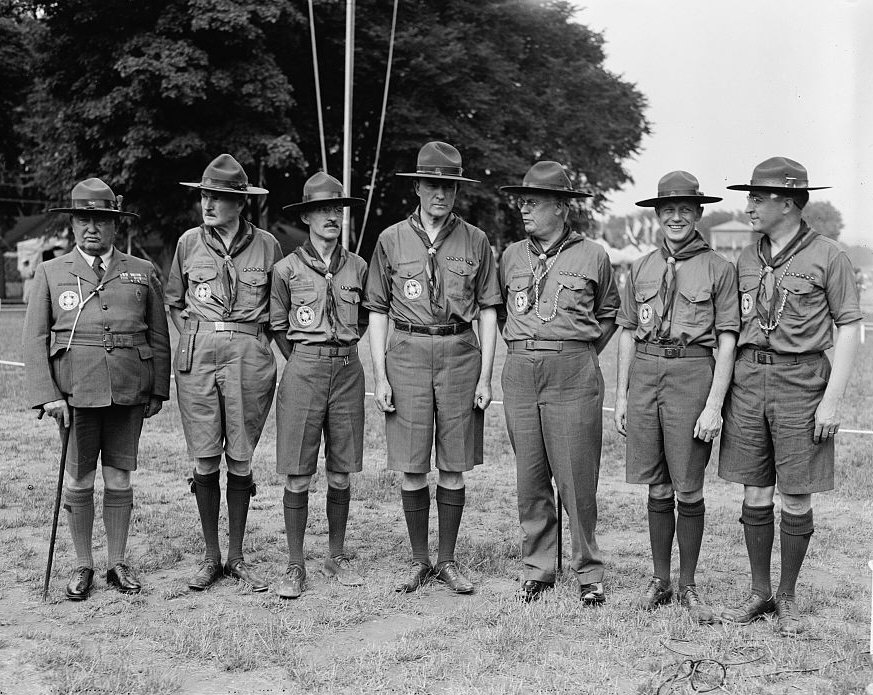
BSA leadership at the 1937 jamboree: E. Urner Goodman, Program Director (3rd from left) Walter Head, BSA President (center) James E. West, Chief Scout Executive (3rd from right)

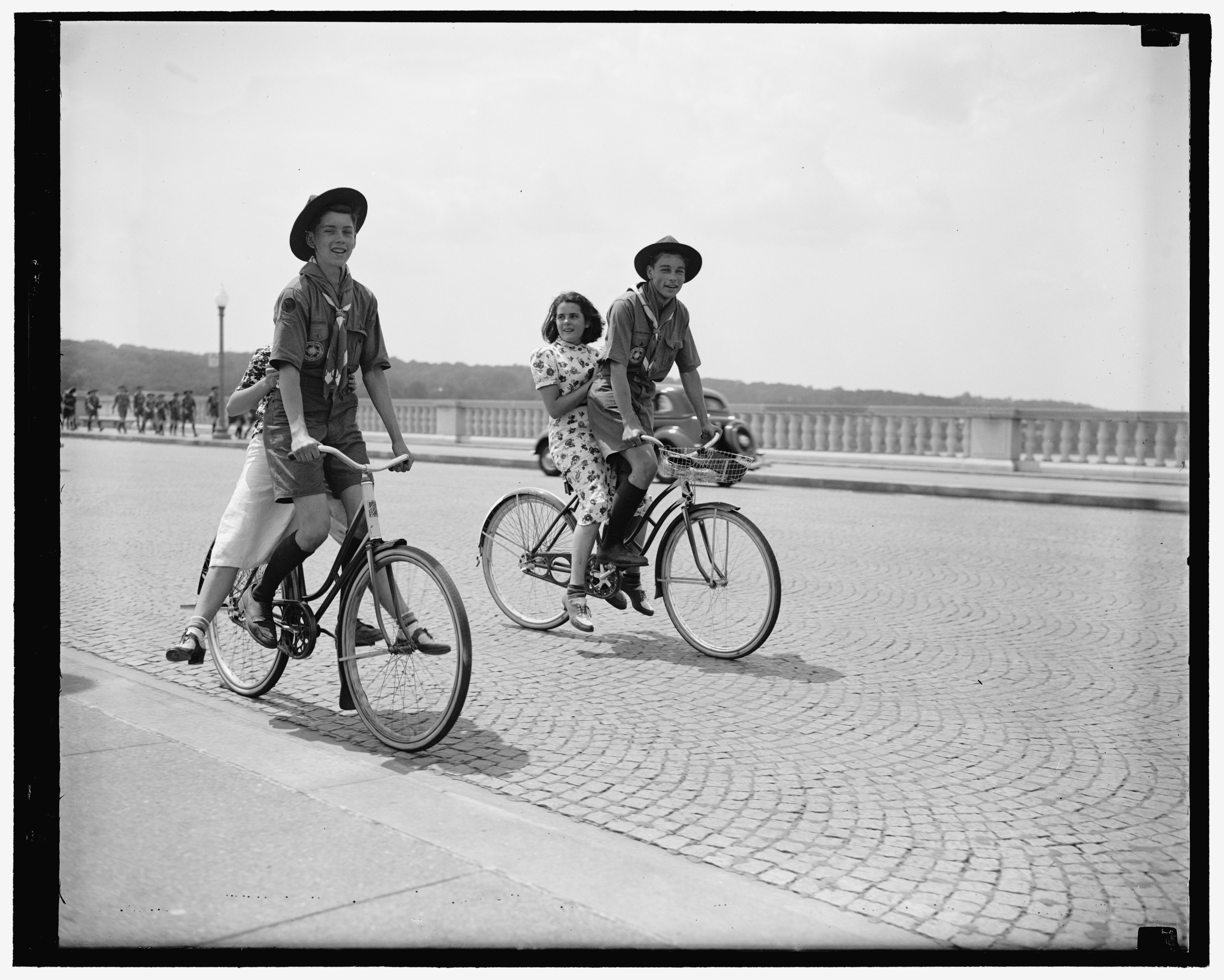
On Bicycles Built For One." Washington D.C., June 30. The Boy Scout's motto of "do a good turn daily" was well observed by these Flint, Mich., scouts, John Kleinnheksel, and Dave Matthews, as they ride their girl friends across Arlington Memorial bridge despite the joshing of their comrades on the sidelines

| Date | Morning | Afternoon |
|---|---|---|
| Wednesday; June 30 | 07:00 Reveille; 07:45 Breakfast; 08:45 Stand by for Flag-raising ceremony 09:00 Simultaneous raising of 1,643 flags 09:00 Mount Vernon excursion for Region IX Scouts and optional tours for all others | 12:00 Luncheon; 2:00 Mount Vernon excursion for Regions X and XI. Optional tours for all others 3:00 Camp theaters; first performance 4:30 Camp theaters; second performance 6:00 Dinner; 7:45 Opening campfire in the Arena near 17th St and Constitution Ave; 10:00 Taps |
| Thursday; July 1 | 07:00 Reveille; 07:45 Breakfast; 8:30 Mount Vernon excursion 9:00 Optional Sightseeing for Regions I, II, V, VI, VII, IX, X, XI and XII; Rehearsals for Arena Displays - Regions III and IV | 12:30 Luncheon; 1:45 Mount Vernon Excursion for Region XII (Boat leaves at 2:00 and will return at 5:00); 2:00 Optional Sightseeing for Regions I, II, V, VI, VII, VIII, IX, X and XI; 2:00 Rehearsals for Arena Displays for Regions III and IV; 3:00 Camp Theaters, first performance 4:30 Camp Theaters, second performance 6:00 Dinner; Arena Display from Regions III and IV, Optional campfires within sections 10:00 Taps |
| Friday; July 2 | 07:00 Reveille; 07:45 Breakfast; 8:30 Mount Vernon excursion Sea Scouts to Annapolis; 9:00 Optional Sightseeing for Regions III, IV, V, VI, VIII, IX, X, XI and XII; 9:00 Rehearsals for Arena Displays for Regions I and II; 9:30 National Council Meeting on Jamboree Grounds | 1:00 Luncheon; 1:45 Mount Vernon Excursion; Optional Sightseeing for Regions III, IV, V, VI, VIII, IX, X, XI and XII; Rehearsals for Arena Displays for Regions I and II; 3:00 Camp Theaters, first performance 4:30 Camp Theaters, second performance 6:00 Dinner; Sunset Jewish Services; 8:00 Arena Displays by Regions I and II, Optional campfires within sections 10:00 Taps |
| Saturday; July 3 | 07:00 Reveille; 07:45 Breakfast; 8:30 Mount Vernon excursion 9:00 Jewish services 9:00 Optional Sightseeing for Regions I, III, IV, VII, VIII, IX, X, XI and XII; 9:00 Rehearsals for Arena Displays for Regions V and VI | 1:00 Luncheon; 1:45 Mount Vernon Excursion; Optional Sightseeing for Regions I, III, IV, VII, VIII, IX, X, XI and XII; Rehearsals for Arena Displays for Regions V and VI; 3:00 Camp Theaters, first performance 4:30 Camp Theaters, second performance 6:00 Dinner; 8:00 Arena Displays by Regions V and VI, Optional campfires within sections 10:00 Taps |
| Sunday; July 4 | 9:00 Protestant denominations services in 6 sections of the camp 9:00 Church of Christ, Scientist service in the auditorium tent 10:00 Catholic Mass; Latter Day Saints Church service in the Chapel at 16th St and Columbia Road | |
| Monday; July 5 | 07:00 Reveille; 07:45 Breakfast; 7:00 Exercise at the Tomb of the Unknown Soldier in Arlington, Virginia | 12:30 Luncheon; 3:00 Camp Theaters, First performance 3:00 Band Concert in the Arena; 4:00 Sea Scout Regatta; 4:30 Camp Theaters, Second performance 6:00 Dinner; 8:00 Independence Day program. District of Columbia fireworks display. 10:00 Taps |
| Tuesday; July 6 | 07:00 Reveille; 07:45 Breakfast; 8:30 Mount Vernon excursion 9:00 Optional Sightseeing for Regions I, II, IV, V, VI, VII and X Rehearsals for Arena Displays - Regions VIII, IX, XI, and XII | 12:30 Luncheon; 1:45 Mount Vernon Excursion; 2:00 Optional Sightseeing for Regions I, II, IV, V, VI, VII, X, XI, XII; 2:00 Rehearsals for Arena Displays - Regions VIII and IX; 3:00 Camp Theaters, first performance 4:30 Camp Theaters, second performance 6:00 Dinner; 8:00 Arena Displays by Regions VIII and IX, Optional campfires within sections 10:00 Taps |
| Wednesday; July 7 | 07:00 Reveille; 07:45 Breakfast; 8:30 Mount Vernon excursion 9:00 Optional Sightseeing for Regions II, III, IV, V, VI, VIII, IX, XI and XII; Rehearsals for Arena Displays - Regions VII and X | 12:30 Luncheon; 1:45 Mount Vernon Excursion; 2:00 Optional Sightseeing for Regions I, II, III, IV, V, VIII, IX, XI, XII; 2:00 Rehearsals for Arena Displays - Regions VII and X 3:00 Camp Theaters, first performance 4:30 Camp Theaters, second performance 6:00 Dinner; 8:00 Arena Displays by Regions VII and X, Optional campfires within sections 10:00 Taps |
| Thursday; July 8 | 7:00 Reveille; 7:45 Breakfast; 8:30 Mobilization for review begins 10:30 National Grand Review and reception | 1:00 Luncheon; 2:00 Mount Vernon Excursion for Region IV; 2:00 Optional Sightseeing for Regions I, II, III, V, VI, VII, VIII, IX and XI; 2:00 Rehearsals for Arena Displays - Regions XI and XII; 3:00 Camp Theaters, first performance 4:30 Camp Theaters, second performance 6:00 Dinner; 8:00 Arena Displays by Regions XI and XII - Farewell to World Jamboree Contingent and Foreign Delegations - All sections together. 10:00 Taps |

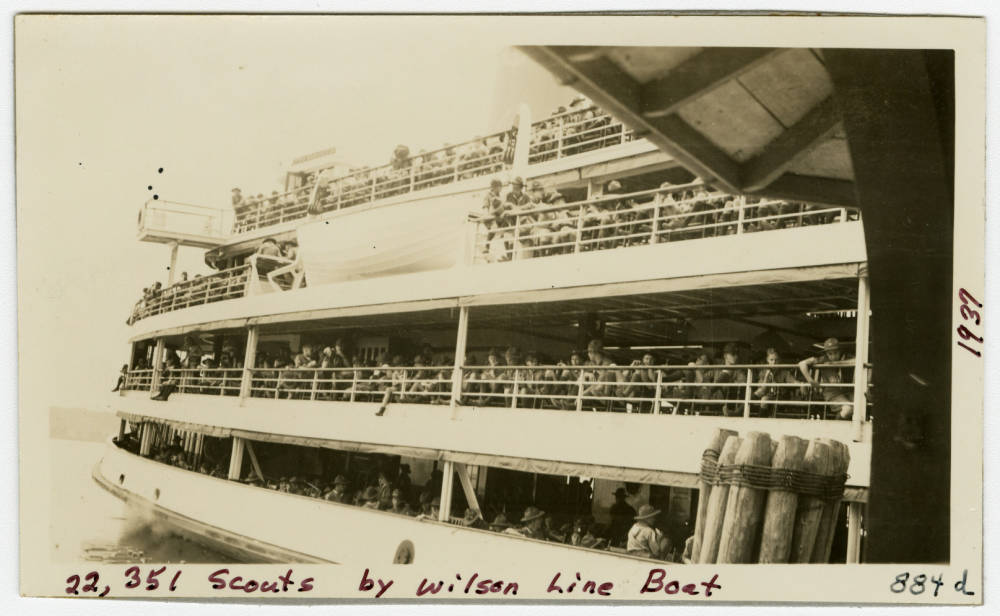
Arrival to Mount Vernon by the Wilson Line Boat

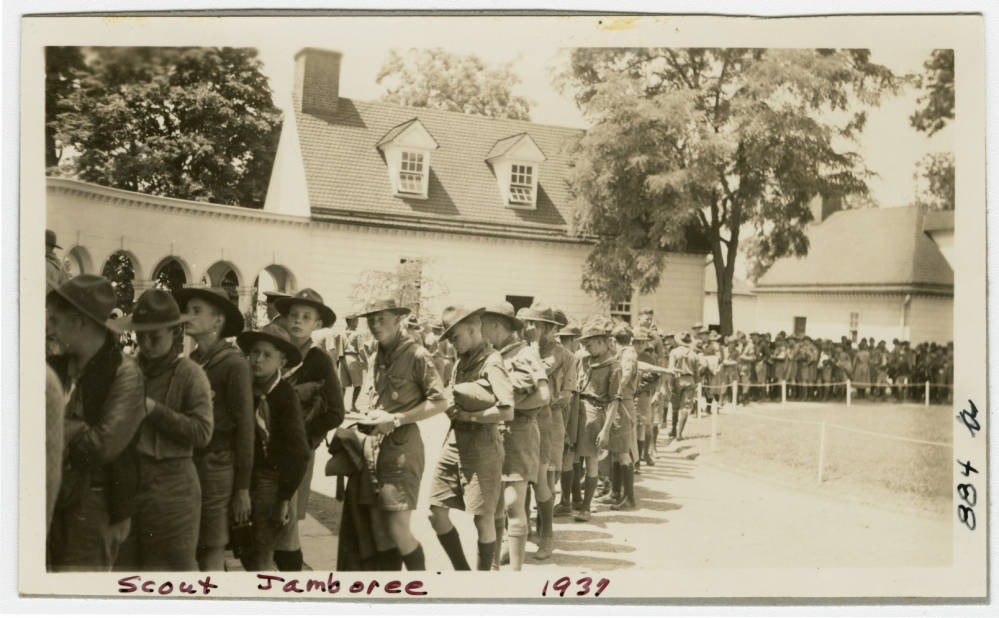
Line to get in George Washington's home on the Mount Vernon grounds

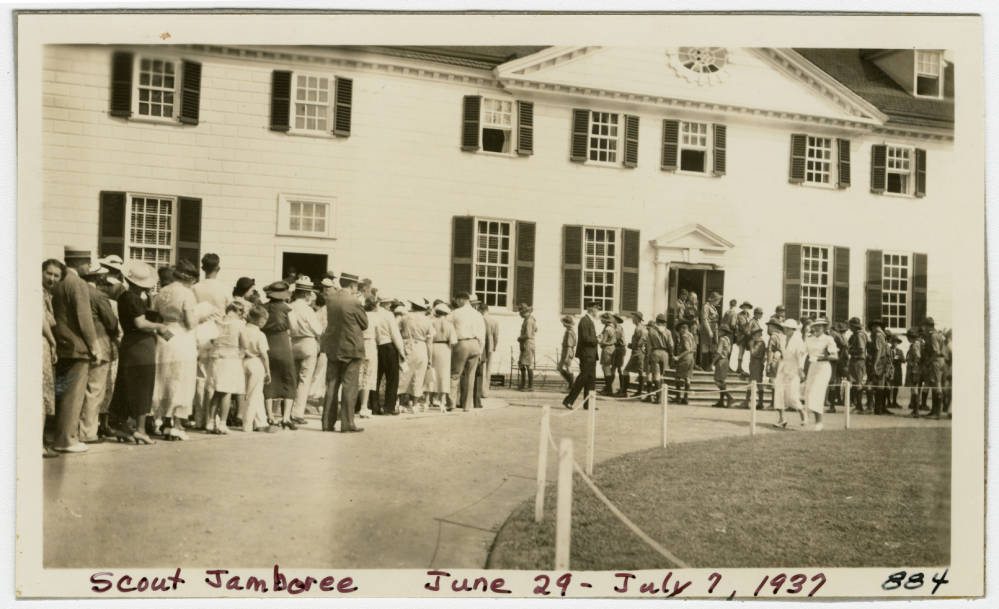
Line to get in George Washington's home on the Mount Vernon grounds with other visitors

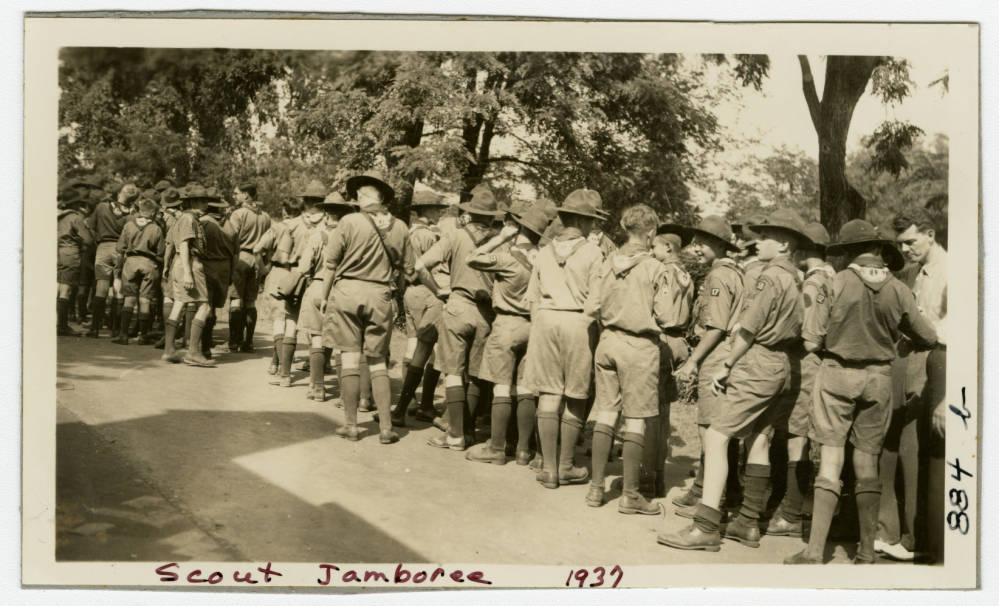
Boy Scouts during the First National Jamboree in Mount Vernon

=== Noticeable Events ===
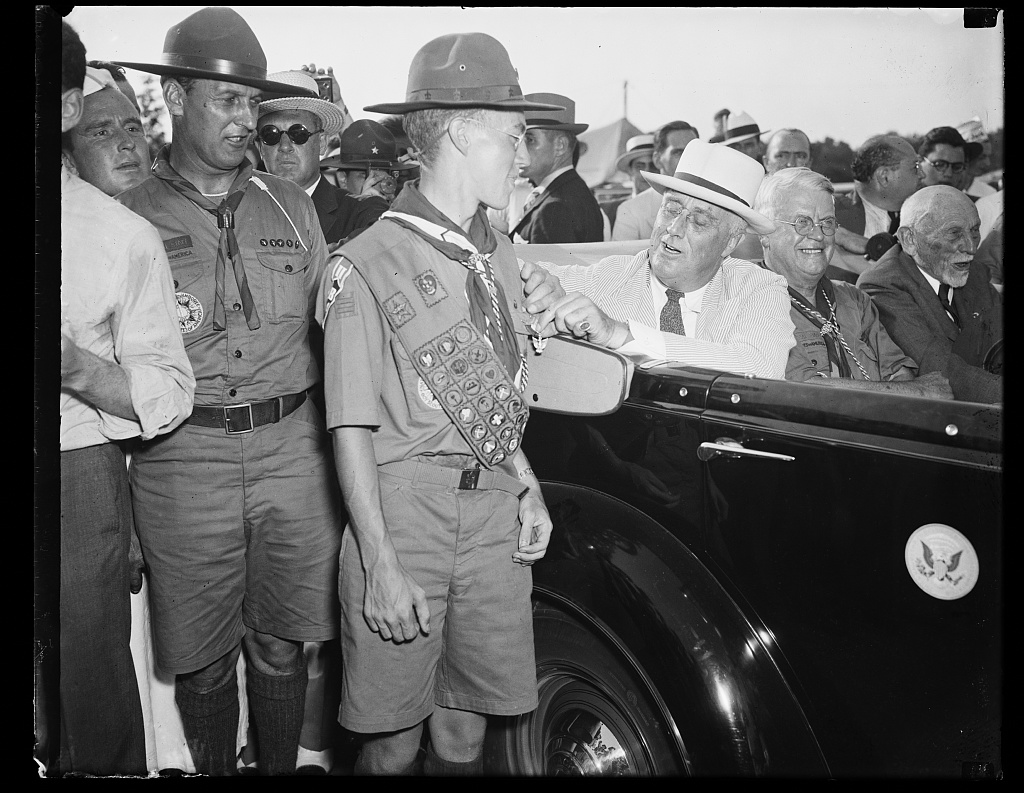
President decorates Duchess County scout. July 7. After leaving the all-state game today President Roosevelt motored to the National Jamboree of the Boy Scouts where he visited the camp of the Duchess County, NY. scouts. He is shown pinning the award of Eagle Scout on Frankly. St. John, Troop #7, of Poughkeepsie, N.Y. In the car with the Chief Executive are James L. West, (center) Chief Scout Executive; and Dan Beard, oldest member of the scouts.

==== June 26 ====
An official Proclamation from the District of Columbia Commissioners was issued urging residents to participate in the public events of the Jamboree and to display flags during the event.

That same day, J. Edgar Hoover and the Federal Bureau of Investigation offered the scouts the opportunity to visit the bureau and the option to get fingerprinted and their prints to be added to the civil identification files of the bureau. The Sea Scouts meanwhile visited the Naval Academy in Annapolis.

==== July 3 ====
A Jewish religious service was held on the evening of July 2 and again on July 3 in the morning in the auditorium tent by a Rabbi from Harrisburg, PA with a reception and social hour taking place later that day for the Jewish boys and their friends. Kosher kitchen service was provided.

A logrolling was scheduled to take place in the Lincoln Memorial Reflecting Pool by Scouts from Aberdeen, Washington. However, the contest was off when it was discovered that a cedar carlin was supplied instead of the regulation fir log.

==== July 4 ====
As the Jamboree happened to fall on July 4, the Boy Scout leaders had instructed the scouts not to shoot firecrackers or any fireworks containing powder. The scouts would take a place of honor during the Ellipse ceremony in front of the White House with 13 scouts standing behind the Speaker's platform to represent the 13 original States. 2,000 were also given various duties in the crowd.

==== July 5 ====
5,000 Scouts filled the amphitheater in Arlington National Cemetery and paid homage to the Unknown Soldier with American and troop flags in ponchos as it was raining. The Scouts represented a delegation of each of the sections of the camp Region VII's band played The Star-Spangled Banner, the National Anthem officially adopted only a few years before. A speech on "Our Heros of War and Peace" was given by Dr. Ray O. Wyland, the National Director of Education for Boy Scouts of America. It was followed by a rendering of "America" while foreign delegations from the Jamboree placed a wreath on the Tomb of the Unknown.

The Sea Scout staged a regatta off Hains Point on the Anacostia River. Facing a downpour, the scouts' stag sailboard, oar and canoe races and demonstrated their life-saving and seamanship skills. This included a comet race of 11 local 16-foot sloops manned by the Scouts, a handicap sailing race, a single-paddle canoe race, a two-paddle race, a four-man canoe race, and a four-oared rowing race.

==== July 6 ====
A radio address from Lord Baden-Powell, founder of the Scouting movement, was broadcast on Shortwave radio from London at 6:45 Eastern Time and was picked up by NBC to be rebroadcast coast-to-coast. The broadcast was heard by the scouts over the public address system. In his address, The Founder of Scouting encouraged the scouts to make friends with scouts from other countries and to continue the friendships by mail for peace. He reminded the scouts that "A Scout is a friend to all and a brother to every other Scout, no matter what class, creed or country the other belongs to."

Sea Scouts were guests of the naval officials in Annapolis.

==== July 7 ====
A group of Scouts were guests at the White House for dinner.

==== July 8 ====
President Roosevelt and First Lady Eleanor Roosevelt took part in the first "Grand National Review" along Constitution Avenue. Instructions had been given to all Scouts to stand at attention as the presidential car rode by. Most failed to remember these instructions. While some remembered to dip their flags and to render the three-fingered Scout salute, most were cheering and whistling. A security incident occurred as the President went by the Florida contingent. A Scout dashed toward the President and was stopped by the United States Secret Service personnel. However, a package was tossed in the car. Upon opening, it was found to be a baby alligator wrapped in newspaper brought by a 15-year-old Scout from St. Petersburg, Florida as a gift for the President.

=== Cavalcade of scouting ===
At 8:00pm every night, took place a show featuring the Boys Scouts. The series was called the Cavalcade of Scouting and features each night a different show including:

- July 1: Scout Fellowship was put on by the District of Columbia Scouts and nearby States (Regions III and IV)
- July 2: The show was put on by the Scouts from New England, New York and New Jersey.
- July 3: Down in Dixie presented by the Scouts from the Carolinas, Florida, Alabama, Mississippi, Arkansas, Louisiana, and Tennessee. It featured a display of the "old and new South, with a plantation scene and other features typical of the cotton States" per the Evening Star's article at the time.
- July 4: No Show (Sunday)
- July 5: No Show (4 July Fireworks)
- July 6: Trails to High Adventure was put on by Scouts from Illinois, Indiana, Michigan, Wisconsin, Minnesota, Kentucky, North Dakota, South Dakota and Montana. It featured a Parade of States, Chariot races, Indian acts, Scouting in action, Paul Bunyan parade and other presentations.
- July 7: The show was put on by scouts from Colorado, Iowa, Missouri, Nebraska, Wyoming, Kansa, Illinois, New Mexico, Oklahoma, Texas and Arkansas. it features a "Cowboy Band", Chariot Race, Indian Dancing, Reenactment of "Oklahoma Run", Covered Wagons, Rope Spinning, Giant Campfire and a Tower Building per the advertisement.
- July 8: The show was put on by Scouts from Oregon, Washington, Nevada, Utah, Arizona, Idaho, Montana and the Territories of Alaska and Hawaii. It included the 425 foreign Scouts' Farewell to America, Hawaiian Songs, Discovery of Gold, Hopi Indian Ceremonial, Spanish Dons, Parade of Covered Wagons and the American Flag presented to the US World Traveling Scouts.

Themes included: Pioneering Pageants, Sea Scouting, Rescue & First Aid Demonstrations, Bridge Building, "Indian Ceremonies" and Campfire fun per the posters.

The shows were open to the general public. 12,000 grandstand seats were available. 6,000 seats were sold for 50 cents and reserved seats were available for $1 and $1.50. These seats could be bought on site as well as at various hotels around the city. Visitors could also visit the 23 different exhibit tents located around the Jamboree free of charge.

=== Foreign scouts ===
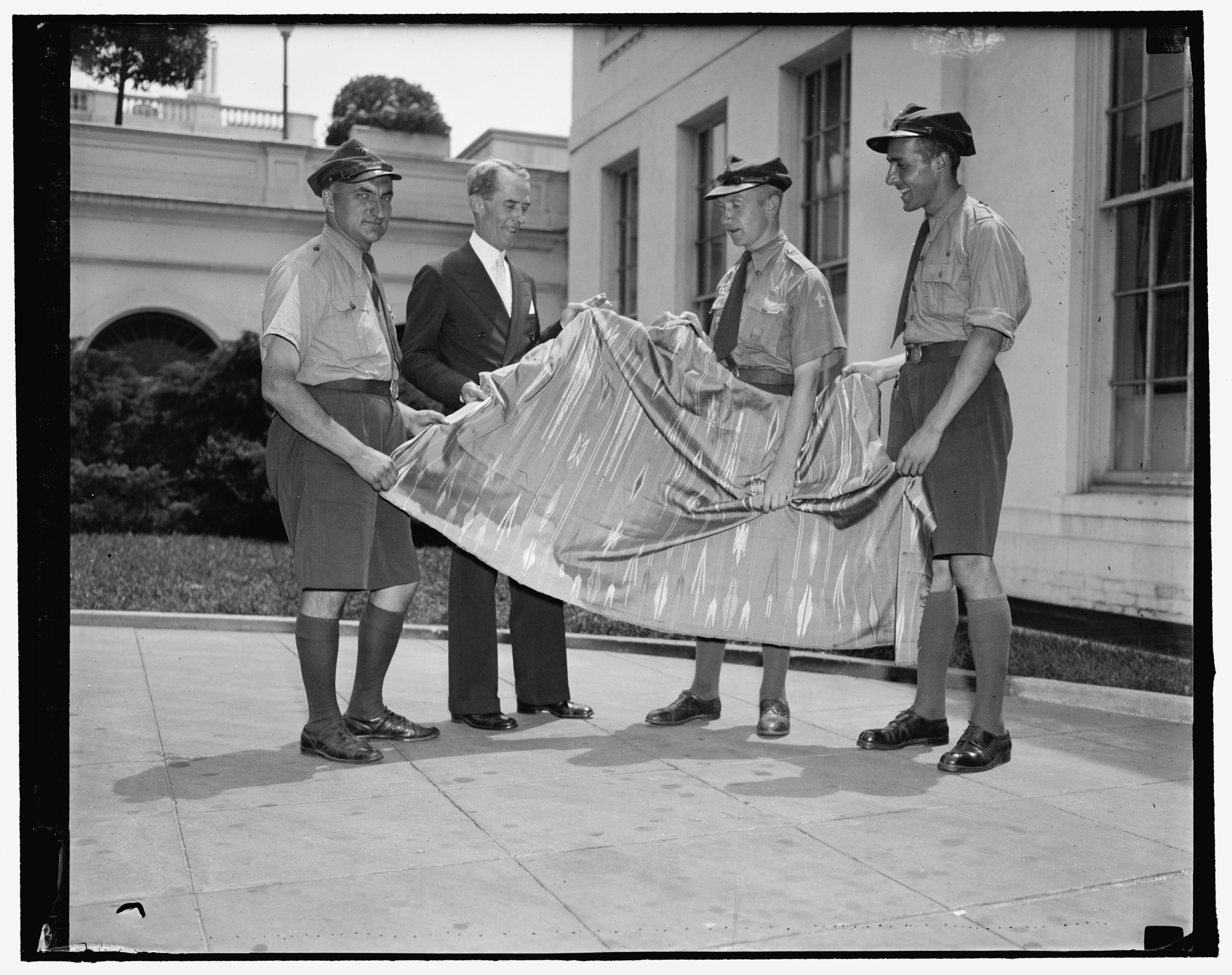
Marvin McIntyre, accepting a cape from Polish Boy Scouts for the President

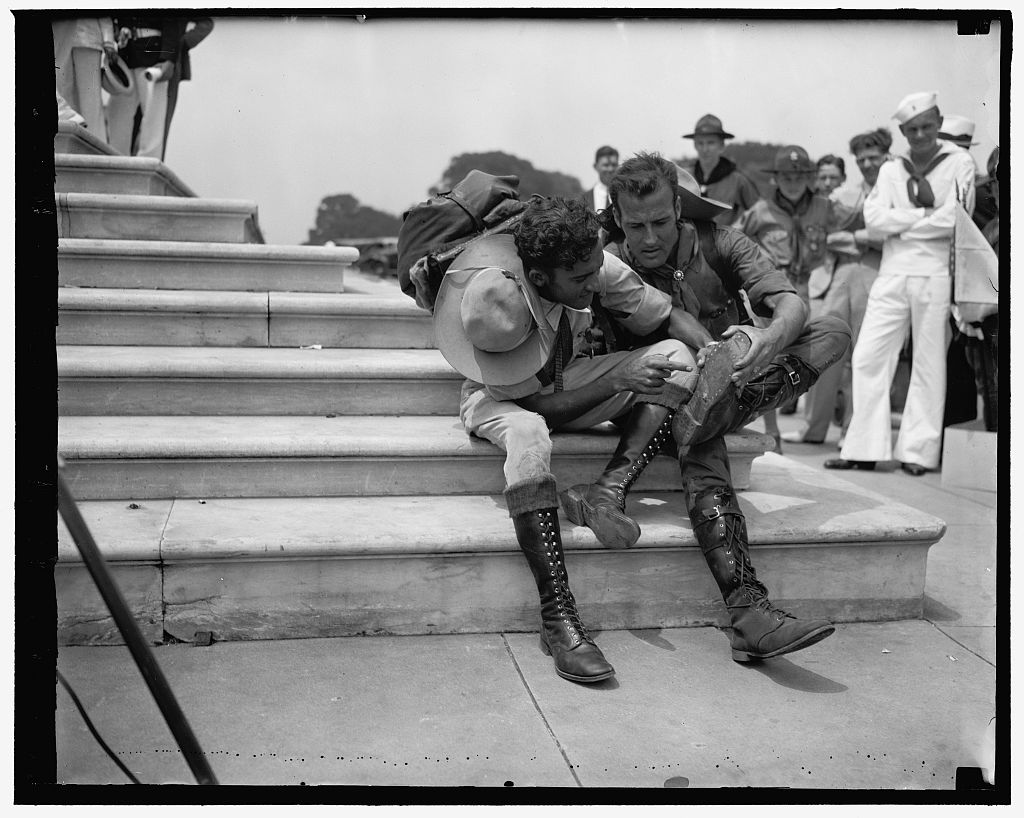
Two Venezuelan Boy Scouts who walked from Venezuela^{C}

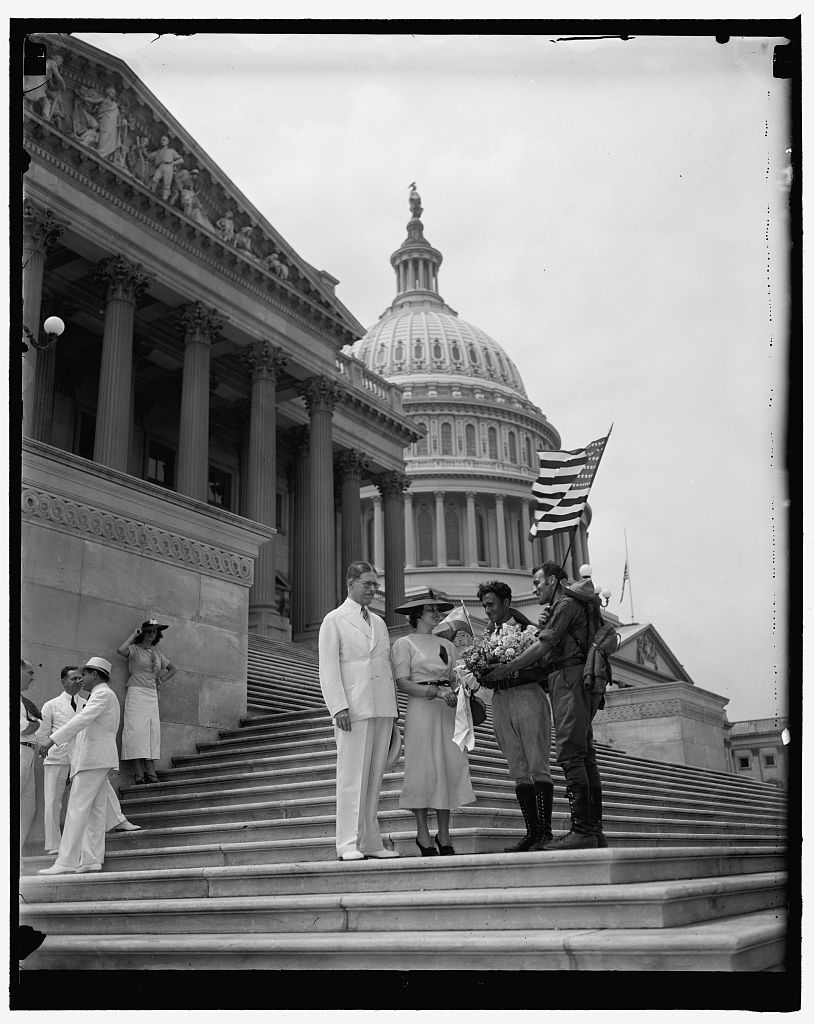
the 2 Venezuelan Boy Scouts in front of the Capitol

While this was a National Jamboree, there were representatives of several foreign countries.

These included:

- England
- New Zealand
- The Bahamas
- Netherlands
- France (7 representatives ^{A})
- Venezuela
- Poland (21 Scouts ^{B})
- Sweden
- Chile
- Lithuania
- Philippines
- China (only one scout)

Their camp was located at the corner of 17th Street and Constitution Avenue and they shared their camp with the American Boy Scouts who were planning on going to the 5th World Scout Jamboree in Holland starting on July 31, 1937, were required to attend the First National Jamboree in Washington, DC as part of their preliminary training. In total 389 Scouts comprised the American contingent.

=== Trading ===
Boy Scouts had already a long tradition of trading between scouts and the Jamboree was an opportunity for the boys to swap with other groups from the US and abroad. All sorts of items were reported by local newspapers as being traded: whale vertebras, horned toads, Florida baby alligator, "Alabama king snake", teeth from the mouth of a "Chesapeake Bay shark", a shell souvenir ring from Puerto Rico, prairie dogs, a "pickled octopus for the West Indies", skulls from long-horn cattle, a Main moose horn, a varnished sailfish, elk teeth, "genuine Indian war bonnet feathers", "California gold ore", etc. It was too much for the Swedish Scouts by July 6, 1937. A sign was installed above their camp with the notice: "No more swapping."

According to an article published in the Evening Star on July 6, 1937, tickets to access the gallery in the House Representatives were a hot item to trade. One Scout was able to trade a ticket for a Texas horned lizard. Another traded his American Scout shorts for a set of Scottish Scout kilts.

== Legacy ==
=== Boy Scout Commemorative Tribute ===
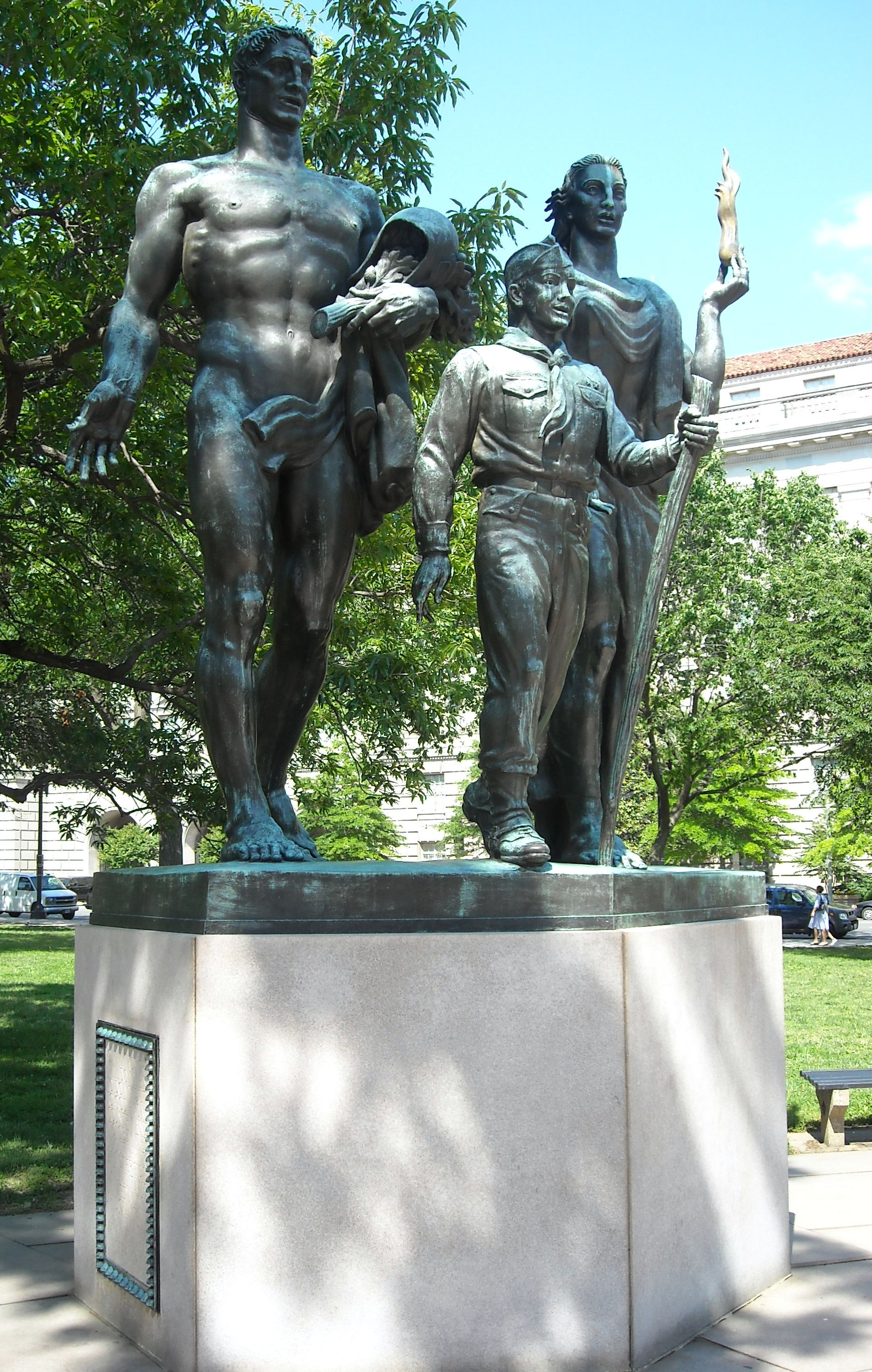
Boy Scout Commemorative Tribute in Washington, D.C.

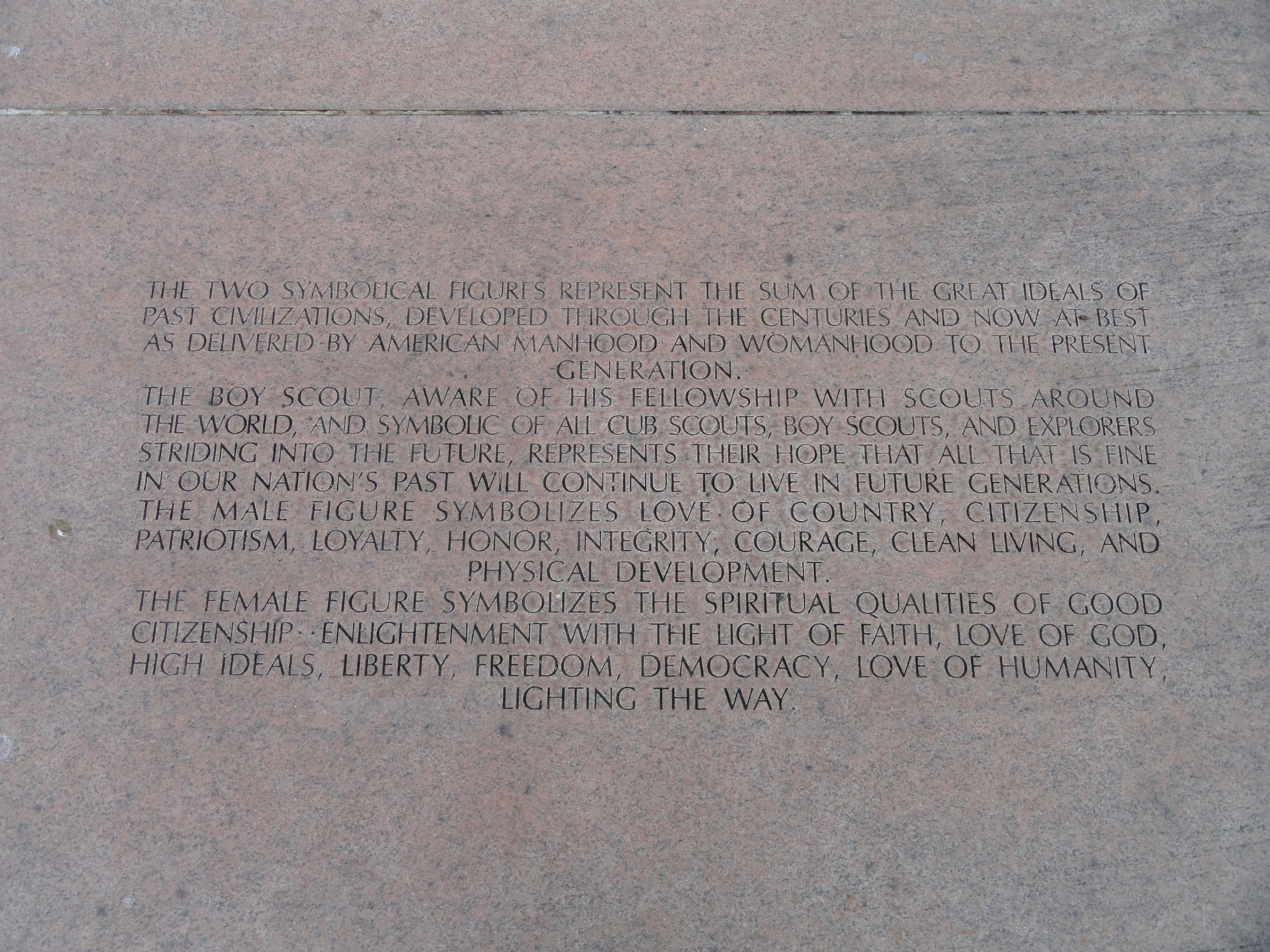
Inscription at the foot of the monument

A monument was dedicated in 1964 on the site of the Jamboree to commemorate the event of 1937. Boy Scout Commemorative Tribute is a bronze statue with three figures:

- A Boy Scout representing the aspirations of all past, present, and future Scouts.
- A male figure with a helmet that represents physical, mental, and moral fitness, love of country, good citizenship, loyalty, honor, and courage.
- A female figure holding the eternal flame of God's Holy Spirit representing enlightenment with the love of God and fellow man, justice, freedom, and democracy.

The symbols are explained to the visitor on an inscription at the foot of the monument.

It was sculpted by Donald De Lue with funds raised by Boy Scout units all around the United States. It was accepted on November 7, 1964, for the country by Associate Supreme Court Justice Tom Clark, on his 50th anniversary of his becoming an Eagle Scout.

On the pedestal is inscribed the Boy Scouts of America Scout Oath:

On my honor I
Will do my best
To do my duty
To God & my
Country and to obey the
Scout law to
Help other people
At all times
To keep myself
Physically strong
Mentally awake
And morally
Straight

=== HOST hikes ===
The National Capital Area Council designed the History of Scouting Trail (HOST Hike). It is a series of 5 hikes honoring founders of Boy Scouts of America designed for Scouts to discover Scouting-related landmarks and sites in Washington, DC.

The Jamboree is mentioned in 3 of the 5 hikes:

- Livingstone Hike: named after Colin Livingstone is a 5.9 mile hike with a guide/questionnaire that Scouts need to complete. It takes the Scouts through the grounds of the First National Jamboree and mentions it on step 16.
- History Hike: a 2.5 mile hike that also memorializes the Jamboree in step 6.
- Hornaday: This hike is a Special Edition of the Livingstone Hike and is related to the Hornaday Awards. It also takes scouts on the grounds of the 1937 National Jamboree in step 16.

== Notes ==
A.Including a Scout Leader, a World War I veteran who met up with the donor of the socks he received in the Tranches in the Battle of Verdun.
B.Most Polish Scouts were older and included students and school teachers. Only 2 of the 21 spoke English. One was a native of Holyoke, MA who moved to Poland at the age of 10. Their interpreter was a National Scout Commissioner who spoke Polish fluently.
C 2 boy scouts walk 800 miles to Washington. Washington, D.C., June 16. A modern odyssey ended today with the arrival in Washington of two Venezuelan Boy Scouts, starting January 11, 1935, from Caracas they tramped 25 miles a day for two years through jungles and swamps to be here in time for the Boy Scout Jamboree, they were met on the steps of the Capitol by the Minister from Venezuela Dr. Don Diogenes Escalante, and Mrs. Juan Lecuna, wife of the Attache of the Legation, Rafael Angel Petit, and Juan Carmona, on the right
