= List of Distinguished Conservationist Award recipients =

Distinguished Conservationist Award Recipients
- Distinguished Conservation Service Award square knot
- Previous Name: William T. Hornaday Award Gold Medal
- Owner: Scouting America
- Founded: 1975

The Distinguished Conservationist Award (DCA) is the division of the Distinguished Conservation Service Award program available to registered adult Scouters. It was created in 1975 as the William T. Hornaday Gold Award to recognize major contributions to environmental conservation, and was renamed in 2020 following a review of Hornaday’s life. The DCA is one of the rarest awards available in Scouting, and requirements include at least twenty years of service and lasting impact in multi-state regions, nationally, or internationally. Only 64 people have received the award since its creation.

The following is a partial list of known Distinguished Conservationists and Hornaday Gold Award recipients who were recognized by the National Conservation Committee of Scouting America for lifetime service in conservation.

== Permanent Wild Life Protection Fund Medal / William T. Hornaday Award Medal (1915–1975) ==
- 1917 – Margaret Olivia Sage (1828–1918) – for a lifetime of philanthropy and for establishing Marsh Island Wildlife Preserve, in Alabama
- 1917 – Drew William Standrod (1858–1942) – for persuading the Idaho Legislature to pass laws protecting the sage grouse
- 1917 – Dr. Thomas Calderwood Stephens (1876–1948) – Professor of Biology at Morningside College, Sioux City, Iowa; awarded for leadership in reintroducing quail and grouse to the Iowa ecosystem
- 1917 – Aldo Leopold (1887–1948) – the "Father of Wildlife Ecology and Environmental Ethics"
- 1919 - John M. Phillips (1861-1953) – conservationist and wildlife photographer who helped bring the Boy Scouts to the United States

== William T. Hornaday Gold Medal (1975–2019) and Distinguished Conservationist (2020-present) List from National Council Office, Year Based on Year Approved (3/21/2025) ==
- 1982 – John F. Shanklin – for over 35 years conservation service with the National Park Service. He was a forest inspector with the Civilian Conservation Corps for nine years prior to World War Two. He worked directly for the Secretary of the Interior as the director of forests through 1962, and for the last 20 years of his career as assistant director for Federal coordination, Bureau of Outdoor Recreation.
- 1984 - Earl Hensel
- 1984 - Ray Boice
- 1985 - Walter Wenzel
- 1986 - Dr. Laurence Walker
- 1986 - Daniel Poole
- 1987 - Ronald Switzer
- 1988 – Jack Holmes Berryman – for fifty years of conservation service between various state and Federal agencies, and as the executive vice president of the International Association of Fish and Wildlife Agencies. Berryman published over 200 works on conservation and was also a recipient of the US Department of the Interior’s Distinguished Service Award.
- 1990 – Dr. J. William Shiner – for his career as professor of park and resource management at Slippery Rock University, PA, as Chairman of the Conservation Committee for five National Scout Jamborees, and his work as Chairman of the Blue Ridge Mountains Council Conservation Committee.
- 1991 - Marlene Lugg
- 1991 – Harold Hill – for conservation work in Alabama
- 1992 - Keith Grove
- 1993 - R. Peterson
- 1993 - James Johnson, Sr.
- 1994 - Bill Getz
- 1994 - Francis Cummings
- 1995 - Patrick Aubuchon
- 1996 - V. Stiles
- 1997 - Dr. Thomas Richards, Los Padres Council
- 1998 - Dan Nelson
- 1998 - Gregory Hansen
- 1998 - Roger Conant
- 1999 - Thomas Birch, Cradle of Liberty Council
- 2000 – James T. Spencer – Worked in conservation for over 30 years. He founded the "Trail Boss" program in 1971 and worked as a volunteer ranger in the Angeles National Forest.
- 2000 - John Gilmore
- 2000 - William Dickinson, National Capital Area Council
- 2001 - L. Watres
- 2001 - William Brookes
- 2003 - Stewart Jacobson, Great Salt Lake Council
- 2003 - Doug Blankinship, National Capital Area Council
- 2004 - Carl Landon Diamond
- 2004 - Charles Rutland
- 2005 – Robert Sturtevant – "for teaching forestry in Ethiopia for the Peace Corps;" Fellow, Society of American Foresters and John Beale Memorial Award recipient: and "for work as a member of the Visiting Forester Committee, Philmont Scout Ranch"
- 2005 - George Tabb, Jr.
- 2006 - Donald Hansen
- 2007 – Dr. Jeffrey Marion – PhD. in Recreation Resources Management; "for his career as a professor of forest resources and environmental conservation, and as a founding member of the board of directors of Leave No Trace." He was awarded the William T. Hornaday Gold Badge by the Blue Ridge Mountains Council, 2006.
- 2007 - Matthew W. Klope, Mount Baker Council
- 2008 - David Bates
- 2009 - Bruce A. Winslow
- 2009 - C. Ben Jelsema
- 2010 – Robert C. Birkby – former chief Scouter in Seattle and author of the 10th, 11th, and 12th editions of the Scout Handbook and the 4th and 5th editions of the Boy Scout Field Book
- 2010 - Tim Beaty
- 2011 - Clint Shock, Ore Ida Council
- 2013 - Robert Sousa, Fisheries scientist and author. Western Massachusetts Council
- 2013 – Dr. Craig Murray – PhD. in Environmental Biostatics; Professor, Scoutmaster, Trail Boss, Hornaday Award Advisor, and Philmont Advisor
- 2013 - Clark Guy, Old North State Council
- 2013 - Glenn Chambers, Great Rivers Council
- 2014 – Hugh Allen Newberry – for decades of conservation and environmental education through the Nevada State Parks system and the US Forest Service, and in Scouting.
- 2014 – Frank H. Wadsworth – for service in natural resource conservation, reforestation, and environmental education.
- 2017 – Larry Warlick – registered Scout and Scouter for over 70 years; Eagle Scout (1955); awarded "for his 30+ years in conservation service in North Carolina as a Wildlife Biologist"
- 2017 – Richard N. (Rick) Williams – PhD. in Conservation Biology, for his 40+ years conservation work on Columbia River salmon and steelhead runs that includes two books describing how salmon runs in the Pacific Northwest could be restored. He is Senior Conservation Advisor for Fly Fishers International, and Chair of the Conservation Committee for the Mountain West Council in Southwestern Idaho. Williams’ Gold Medal was awarded on April 19, 2017.
- 2017 – Michael Huneke – for over 25 years’ service in the U.S. Forest Service, including his work as a Wildlands Firefighter and as the Forest Stewardship Program Coordinator, where he prepared more than 500 forest stewardship plans. Huneke also contributed to the 2016 edition of the Boy Scout Handbook and was the Chairman of the Conservation Trail at the 2017 National Jamboree. He was awarded the Gold Medal at the 2017 National Boy Scout Jamboree.
- 2017 – William “Mike” Perkins – “for five decades of conservation work and dedication to the environment” in Tremonton, UT. Perkins’ Gold Medal was awarded on July 27, 2017 during the National Boy Scout Jamboree.
- 2017 - Daniel L. Coberly} – registered Scout and Scouter for over 50 years; Eagle Scout (1969); awarded “for his life-long personal environmental accomplishments that span five decades, numerous countries, continents, and cultures”
- 2017 – Mark S. Anderson – 19-year Director of Program at Philmont Scout Ranch, "for passionate and exemplary dedication to conservation and environmental education through innovative programs that have impacted hundreds of thousands of our nation's young people." Anderson received his Gold Medal at his retirement ceremony at Philmont Scout Ranch on November 4, 2017.
- 2018 - Edward Warner, Denver Area Council
- 2018 - Dr. David L. Kulhavy, East Texas Area Council
- 2018 - Leon E. App, Heart of Virginia Council. With over 55 years of conservation experience dating back to 1963, Mr. App worked for the Commonwealth of Virginia for 38 years, starting in 1966 as a Forester in the Virginia Department of Forestry and retiring in 2004 as the Deputy Director of the Virginia Department of Conservation and Recreation. Among other things, he helped create the Virginia Natural Heritage Program and drafted more than 100 pieces of significant conservation legislation for the Commonwealth of Virginia. Mr. App's Scouting achievements include Eagle Scout (1956), Explorer Silver Award (Type II, 1957), Silver Beaver Award (1990), and Outstanding Eagle Scout (2017). As an adult leader, he has assisted over 1,200 Eagle Scouts as the local district Eagle Advancement Chair, since 1980. His Gold Medal was approved on March 21, 2018 and awarded on July 21, 2018.
- 2018 – John J. Moriarty – for over twenty years work protecting amphibian and reptile species in the Upper Midwest. Moriarty is a former Sea Scout, Quartermaster Award recipient, and adult volunteer. He published six books on Minnesota’s native amphibians and reptiles, and is the senior manager of wildlife and acting director of natural resources management for the Three Rivers Park District in Minnesota. His Hornaday Gold Medal was approved in October 2018.`
- 2019 - Gary Stolz, Chester County Council
- 2019 - Rex Eric Hayes, Northeast Georgia Council, for his global leadership and education of our land and water sustaining a record of service for over 30 years in projects on 6 continents, 50 countries and 36 U. S. States. These projects affect hundreds of thousands of people and their future to consume contamination-free water while helping eliminate or control erosion. He is recognized as a global luminary and chairs or is president of organizations such as the Sustainability Management Association, the Southeastern Rainwater Catchment Association (SERCA), a Texas Rainwater Catchment Association (TRCA).
- 2019 - Herbert F. Darling, Jr., Greater Niagara Frontier Council

During 2020, the William T. Hornaday Gold Medal was transitioned to the BSA Distinguished Conservationist award. All three Gold Medals approved in 2020 were awarded after this transition and were re-designated as the BSA Distinguished Conservationist award.

- 2020 - Dr. William W. Bowerman, National Capital Area Council, for over 35 years of work on conservation of bald eagles and other birds of prey on five continents. He served for 18 years on the International Joint Commission, Great Lakes Science Advisory Board, including 3 years as United States Co-Chair. Bowerman's Scouting achievements include Eagle Scout (1976), Vigil Honor (1978), NESA Outstanding Eagle Scout Award (2019), and Silver Beaver Award (2020). He has served as an adult leader in Cub Scouts and Boy Scouts, including service at the District and Council levels. He has been a professor at Clemson University and a Department Chair at the University of Maryland, and supervised over 35 graduate degrees. He is a National Fellow of The Explorers Club. His Hornaday Gold Medal was approved on February 10, 2020.
- 2020 - David G. Brickley, National Capital Area Council, for over 45 years service to national natural resource conservation as an elected official, civil servant and private citizen. As a Virginia House of Delegates member from 1976 to 1998, he was instrumental in promoting conservation in the state, and sponsored legislation creating Leesylvania State Park on the Potomac River; protecting this environmental and historic property from development. As Director of the Virginia Department of Conservation and Recreation from 1998 to 2002, the Department was awarded in 2001 the National Gold Medal Award for the Best State Park System in America. In November 2001 his leadership as reported in the Virginia-Pilot newspaper resulted in Virginia and North Carolina signing the first-ever agreement to help restore the Albemarle and Pamlico sounds, which form the second-largest estuary in North America. Mr. Brickley is the founder of the 1,300-mile September 11 National Memorial Trail connecting the three"9/11" memorials. His Hornaday Gold Medal was approved on July 20, 2020.
- Dr. Gary L. Miller, National Capital Area Council, for over 35 years of research in insect biology and systematics. A USDA research entomologist for 30 years, his work and expertise have major impact in regulatory decision making in protecting U.S. agriculture. Miller served as the former Research Leader of the USDA’s Systematic Entomology Laboratory. As a USDA research entomologist, he is also the curator of the Smithsonian’s National Aphid Collection. Miller's Scouting achievements include Eagle Scout (1973), National Award of Merit (2003), Silver Beaver Award (2013), and NESA Outstanding Eagle Scout Award (2020). He has served as an adult leader in Cub Scouts and Boy Scouts as well as the District level and on staff at several National Jamborees and a World Jamboree. His Hornaday Gold Medal was approved on October 26, 2020.

Since 2021, the following individuals were awarded the BSA Distinguished Conservationist award.

- Stephen N. Williams, Del-Mar-Va Council, awarded February 2, 2021.
- Dr. Brent Hagland, Central Minnesota Council, awarded June 23, 2021.
- Larry Musser, Black Swamp Council, awarded August 16, 2021.
- Wayne Schimpff, The Pathway to Adventure Council, awarded March 28, 2022.
- Attila Bality, Great Southwest Council, awarded April 24, 2023.
- Scott Anderson, Patriot's Path Council, awarded July 27, 2023.
- Dr. William "Bill" Hoover, Sagamore Council, awarded August 28, 2023.
- Brenda Potterfield, Great Rivers Council, awarded November 27, 2023. - for her 40+ years involved in Scouting, starting with her son’s participation in Cub Scouts. She is the co-founder of MidwayUSA, a retail catalog company serving the outdoor community. She and her husband have been recognized for their contributions to conservation organizations encouraging outdoor participation by youth, including the Conservation Federation of MO’s ‘Conservationist of the Year’, Outdoor Channel’s ‘Honorary Lifetime Achievement Award’, NRA Women’s Leadership Forum ‘Lifetime Achievement Award’, and many other conservation awards. Potterfield’s scouting achievements include the James E. West Fellow, the Ernest Thompson Seton Award (2021), and Silver Beaver Award (2013). She is a member of the Great Rivers Council Board of Directors and has been a committee member of the BSA Sporting Clays Fundraiser for 25 years. In 2008, the Potterfield family started the MidwayUSA Foundation that helps support over 2,000 high school, college, 4-H and youth shooting teams. In 2020, the family donated a 13,000 sq foot building to the BSA Great Rivers Council. This donation allowed for the creation of the Adventure Center that provides a Scout Store, indoor climbing wall, invention and robotics labs, office space and a special event venue for the Council.
- Bruce Deadman, Bay-Lakes Council, awarded February 26, 2024.
- Timothy Babb, Natural State Council, awarded July 2, 2024.

-Timothy earned his Eagle Scout in 1994 and received the OA Vigil Honor in 1995. He was the trail/trek director at Camp Orr High Adventure Base from 1994-1996, and a 28-day Trail Crew Foreman at Philmont Scout Ranch in 1998. He was instrumental in the development of the Order of the Arrow’s Wilderness Voyage program at Northern Tier National High Adventure Base where he spent seven seasons from 1999-2006. Timothy served at all five locations of the 2008 National ArrowCorps5 projects (https://oa-scouting.org/history/arrowcorps5), and was the operations deputy chief at the Bridger-Teton site. In 2009, he was an assistant field director for the Minnesota Conservation Corps. In 2011, he was a brigade leader for the instructor corps for the SummitCorps national service project. (https://oa-scouting.org/history/summitcorps) He went on to earn the Hornaday Gold Badge in 2011, the Distinguished Service Award in 2012, and the Section Award of Merit in 2017. He created the Section 8 ArrowCorps which provided large scale conservation projects from 2016 to 2021. He helped create and launch the Arrowman Conservation School in 2012. In 2020, he started the Arrowman Conservation, Education, and Sustainability (ACES) program for the National Order of the Arrow Conferences. Also in 2020, he co-founded the nonprofit North American Trail Education (NATE) to provide the resources and knowledge to rehabilitate and build sustainable pathways into the wilderness. He serves as chairman of NATE. In 2024, he was awarded the Distinguished Conservationist Award. (https://event.oa-scouting.org/events/noac2024/news/arrowman-recognized-for-a-lifetime-of-service/)

- Earl W. Howser, National Capital Area Council, awarded July 2, 2024.
- David O'Leary, Western Massachusetts Council, awarded September 14, 2024. Scouting America Leave No Trace / Outdoor Ethics /Conservation Committee member since 2008, serving as chair from 2014-2020. Sierra Club conservation leader.
