= John Beauchamp (Plymouth Company) =

Financier of American colonisation

- Born: c. 1592; Cosgrove, Northamptonshire, England
- Died: 1655 (aged 62–63); Reigate, England
- Spouse: Alice Freeman

John Beauchamp (c. 1592–1655) was an influential member of the Plymouth Company which funded the establishment of the Pilgrims' colony. He was born about 1592 in Cosgrove, Northamptonshire, England, the son of Thomas Beauchamp of Cosgrove and Dorothy (nee Clark) Beauchamp

== Background ==
Beauchamp was the son of Thomas Beauchamp of Cosgrove and his wife Dorothy. His Norman French last name was pronounced as the British Anglicized "Beacham". His son Edmund moved to Maryland, where he became a planter and clerk of court for Somerset County from 1665 to1695. His descendants in Maryland and Kentucky were influential planters and politicians. One of them, Champ Clark, was Speaker of the United States House of Representatives from 1911 to 1919.

Beauchamp was born about 1592 in Cosgrove, Northamptonshire, England. Leaving Cosgrove as a young man to make his life in London, he was apprenticed as a salter. He did not stay within his own trade, but began dealing in cloth and other goods as an 'interloper.' Cosgrove is close to the old Roman road known as Watling Street, and the busy town of Stony Stratford. John would have witnessed traders travelling up and down the road to and from London, and this may have influenced his career plans.

Author Nick Bunker states that one of John's brothers was a haberdasher in London. John's uncle, another John Beauchamp, was a merchant in Amsterdam who left John 2,000 guilders at his death in 1615, as well as some London house contents, and the management of a further 5,000 guilders for two years. Bunker describes how, within less than a decade, Beauchamp rose to become by far the largest importer of the sort of goods sold by travelling salesmen of the time. This included exports of fleeces, horsehair, and black rabbit skins, along with stockings which were popular in Holland. He would then import household goods which could be sold far and wide across England by peddlers travelling along the main roads out of London.

== Career ==
Financing the Mayflower Voyage

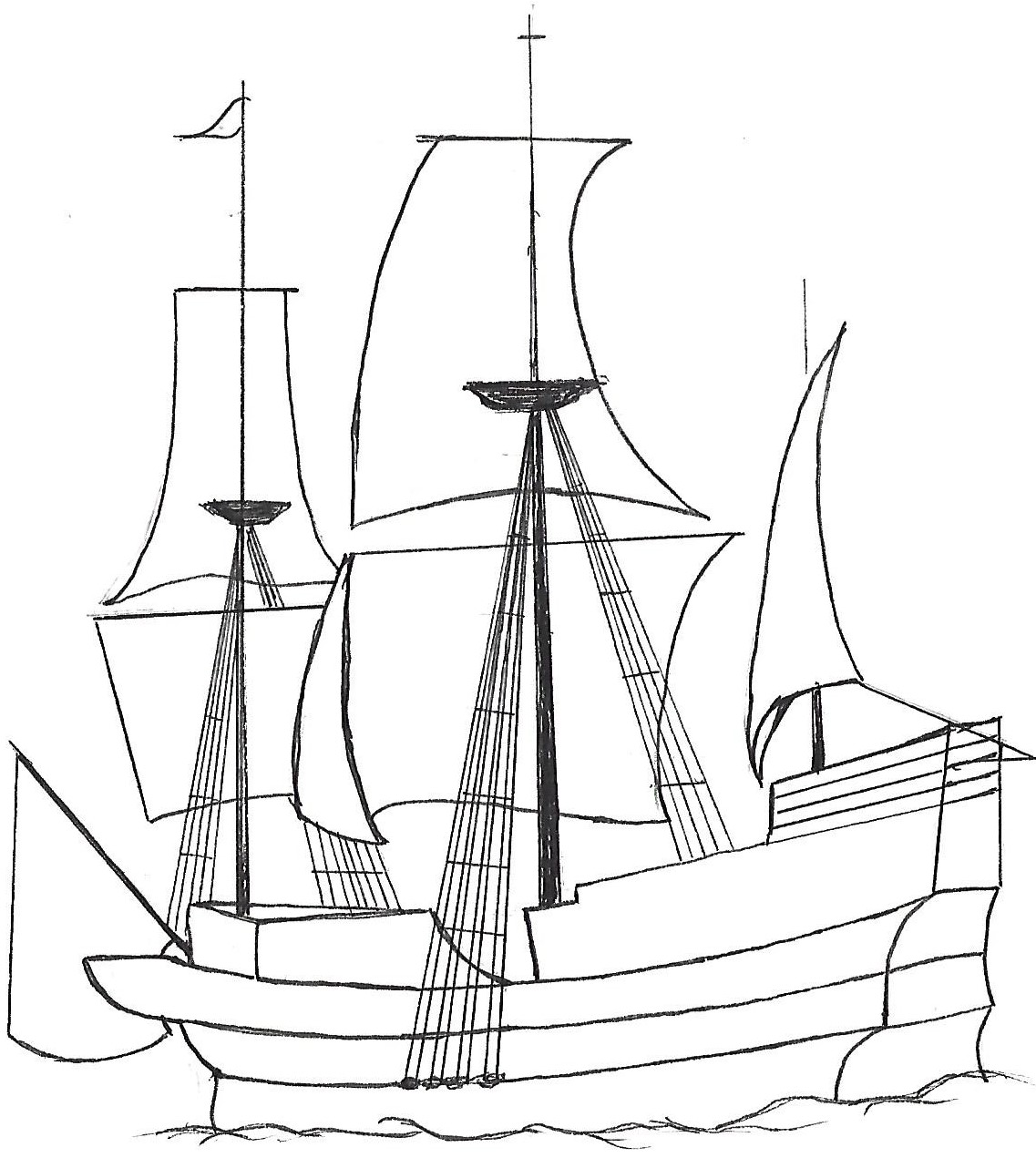
Line drawing of the Mayflower

Around 1619, a group of merchant adventurers gathered in London at the direction of King James to finance a voyage to Plymouth Plantation in present-day Massachusetts. King James wanted Episcopalian representation to oversee the Puritans in the company and Beauchamp filled that role.

The Plymouth Colony

In 1624 four "adventurers", including John Beauchamp, sent a statement of affairs to the Plymouth Colony explaining why most of the backers had given up on them through losses at sea and failed profits. They asked that after the colonists' needs were filled that "you gather together such commodities as ye cuntrie yields and send them over to pay debts and ingagements which are not less than £1400." By 1626 the Plymouth colony was in deep financial trouble.

The English Partners

A Mayflower passenger, Isaac Allerton, was sent to sign a new deal with the 41 remaining investors. All the original capital from 1620 was written off. The Pilgrims' debt was revised to £1800, to be repaid in instalments every September up to 1636, to five men led by Pocock and Beauchamp. James Sherley, Richard Andrews, Timothy Hamerly and John Beauchamp were later known as the "English Partners of the Purchasers". The investors in England gave up all claims to all "the said stocks, shares, lands, marchandise and chatles" in the Plymouth plantation.

The Undertakers

In July 1627 "The Undertakers", led by Bradford, Standish and Allerton, with others including John Howland, agreed to pay the sums owed in London and became personally liable in the event of default. The Undertakers would get the profits of the beaver fur trade for six years for the whole colony, and profits from corn and tobacco, to be reassessed after 1633. High interest loans came from Beauchamp, Sherley, Pocock and others. Sherley, Goldsmith, and Beauchamp were named as agents to receive and trade in all goods and merchandise sent to England and purchase supplies for Plymouth Colony.

Trading from Clapham

In 1633 John Beauchamp and James Sherley took a lease together on a house on an estate in Clapham called Brick Place, later named Clapham Place. In 1633 Beauchamp was serving in local government in Walbroke Ward. Alice, his daughter also lived at Clapham, where she may have met John Doggett. In 1633, the Undertakers in the Plymouth Colony allocated tracts in the Scituate area to the English Partners, promised to them in 1627. Timothy Hatherley became a resident of Scituate, and bought out the shares of Beauchamp and Andrews, evidenced by a document of 1646.

Dissolving the Partnership

Beauchamp and Sherley argued in 1636, because John Beauchamp and Richard Andrews had received no money since 1631, when each had lost £1100. The settlers sent beaver pelts to London from which Beauchamp was able to recoup £400. Beauchamp and Andrews sued Sherley for £12000 for furs for which he had no accounts – but Sherley won the case. By 1641 all parties in the Plymouth affair wanted their freedom. The remaining joint stock, consisting of housing, boats, implements and commodities, valued at £1400 was shared by the London Partners. The Plymouth leaders promised the Partners £1200 at £400 down and £200 per year to settle the debt. In 1645 John received houses and lands in Plymouth from Bradford, Prence, Standish and Winslow, recorded in the Plymouth Colony Deeds. John Beauchamp wrote to them in 1649, conducting business in Little Britain, London near to St Bartholomew's Hospital.

== Family ==
Beauchamp married Alice Freeman daughter of Edmund I Freeman and Alice Coles of Pulborough in Sussex in December 1615. John was 23 and Alice, born in 1601, only 14 years old. Their children were:

- John born 1615/16 in Pulborough
- Alice baptised 22 June 1617 in Pulborough, married John Doggett on 10 August 1643, at St Mary's Church, Battersea, London
- Thomas, born 1619 in Pulborough, married Sarah Felps in Reigate. Died in Reigate 1647
- Mary, born 1623 in Pulborough, married Walter Wolsey in Reigate 1650
- Edmund born 16 December 1625, place of birth uncertain, apprenticed with John Doggett as a mercer for eight years from 19 March 1647. Made a Freeman of London in 1656. Left for America 1655. Married Sarah Dixon in Somerset County, Maryland in 1668.
- Stillborn daughter registered 1630, St Swithin, London Stone
- Edward baptised 1631 St Swithin's London Stone
- Richard baptised c 1633 St Swithin's London Stone
- Elizabeth baptised 1635 St Swithin's London Stone
- Elen baptised 1637 St Swithin's London Stone, died in 1639
- George baptised 1639 St Swithin's London Stone, apprenticed on 17 June 1656 to Thomas Wickes as a mercer for seven years, at Paternoster Row in London. Married Sarah Higham in Rempleton, Nottinghamshire on 7 December 1663 (Boyd's Marriage Index, 3d Series). Settled in Nottinghamshire.
- Sarah baptised 1641 St Swithin's London Stone, may have died in 1642.

The Beauchamp family became well established in Reigate. John's wife Alice's father had died, and by 1651 Alice's widowed mother Alice Cole Freeman was living in Reigate with them. Alice herself died in 1650 aged 50, leaving John widowed after a long marriage of 36 years. John was recorded as a magistrate in 1653.

== Death and legacy ==
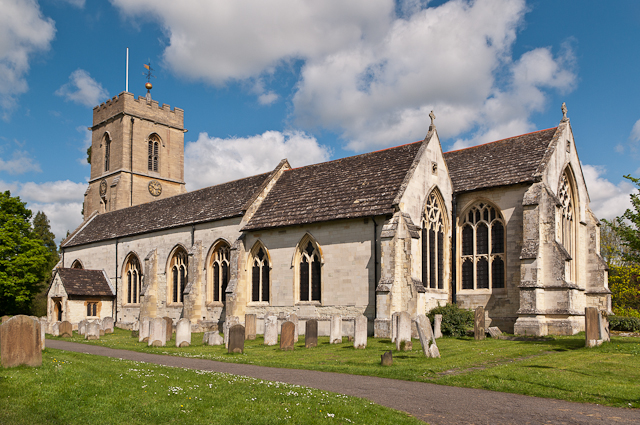
St Mary's Church, Reigate

After 1653 Beuchamp's health failed him, and he wrote his will in "the frailtie of my own health and the certaintie of Death and uncertaintie of the time of my departure", before his death at the age of 63, still at Reigate, in 1655, where it is assumed that he was buried in St Mary's Church.

Beuchamp's will left money "to the poor of the parish of Cosgrave in Northamptonshire" where he still had relatives, and also to the poor of Reigate. John's children received substantial sums of money, from the sales of "Coppiehold Lands Tenements and hereditiments". The Beauchamp story in the New World is well documented by their American descendants, as is that of the descendants of Alice Beauchamp and John Doggett.

His brother-in-law was Edmund Freeman, one of the founders of Sandwich, Massachusetts. Among his descendants are Jereboam O. Beauchamp, Noah Beauchamp, major league professional baseball player, Jim Beauchamp, presidential candidate, James "Champ" Clark, and author Dan Coberly.

== Bibliography ==
- Bradford, William (13 November 2016). 1630-1651, Of Plymouth Plantation. CreateSpace Independent Publishing Platform. ISBN 978-1540348692.
- Bunker, Nick (2011). Making Haste from Babylon: The Mayflower Pilgrims and their World – A New History. Pimlico. ISBN 978-0307386267.
- Caffrey, Kate (1974). The Mayflower. Purnell Book Services, Ltd. ISBN 978-0812818574.
- Sir Henry Saint-George (1880). The Visitation of London, Anno Domini 1633, 1634, and 1635. Vol. 1.
- Walker, Timothy (2016). The First Clapham Saints: A London Village 1600-1720. Timothy Walker. ISBN 978-0956716316.
- Will of John Beauchamp PRO PROB 11/245 folio 19
