= Daniel L. Coberly =

American author (born 1954)

Daniel Leo Coberly
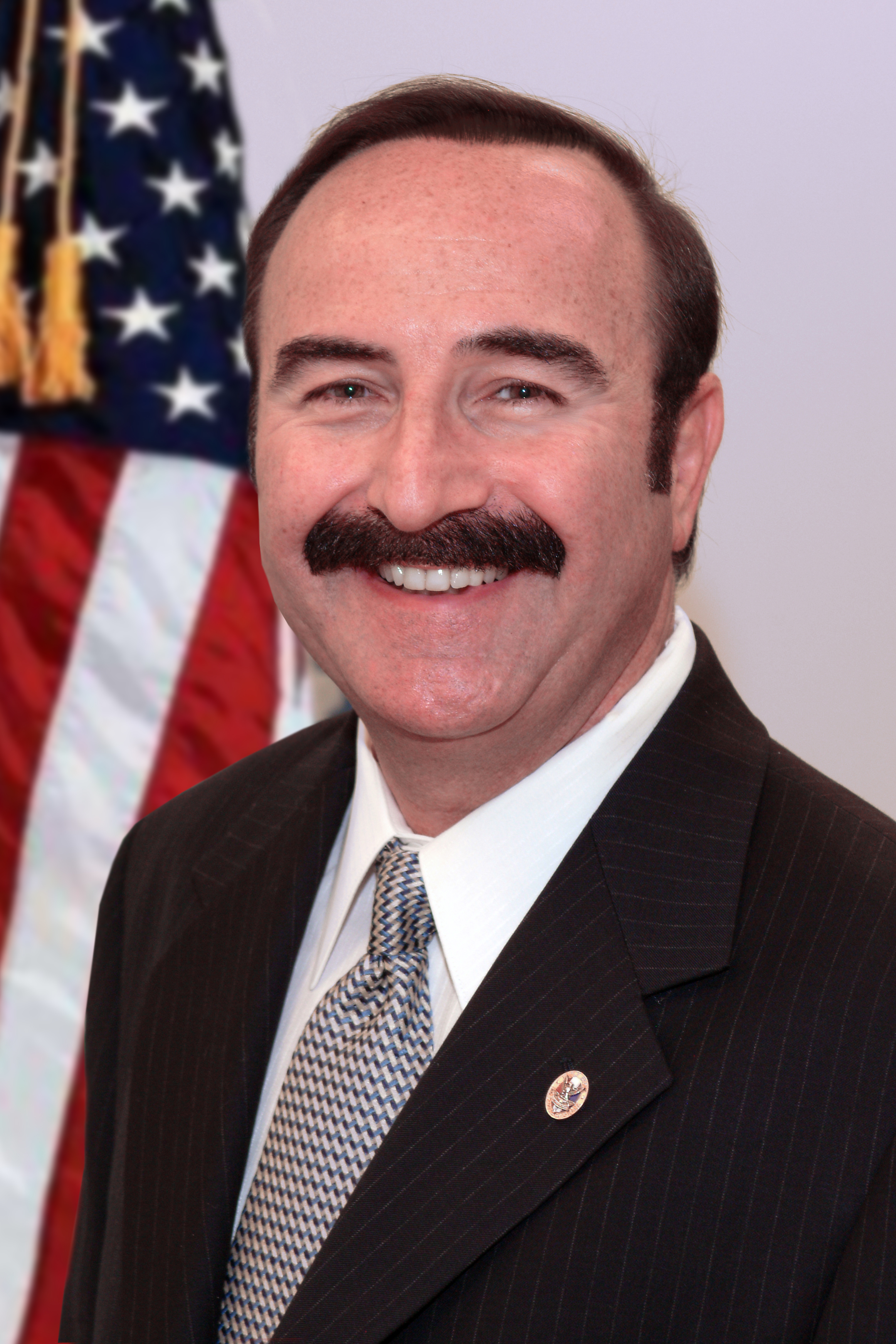
- Coberly circa 2010
- Born: 1954 (age 71–72); Fort Belvoir, Virginia, U.S.
- Education: Excelsior College (BS); Norwich University (MA)
- Occupations: Military Officer, Civil Servant, Author
- Children: 1
- Writing career
- Notable awards: Legion of Merit, Distinguished Conservation Service Award, Silver Buffalo Award

Daniel Leo Coberly (born 1954) is an American author, journalist, historian, and noted civil servant from the United States. The son of a Special Forces Non-commissioned officer with the United States Army and a French war bride, he was born in Fort Belvoir, Virginia.

== Early life and education ==
Coberly is the son of Willie L. Coberly, a Special Forces NCO and Denise Maria Zagni. Born in Fort Belvoir, Virginia, his family moved to Europe soon after his birth to follow his father's postings with the US Army. In 1972, Coberly started his college studies at Oklahoma State. He left school to join the Army during Vietnam and take advantage of the GI Bill. During his time in military service he continued his studies at Ball State, Jacksonville State, and UMUC. Coberly Graduated from Excelsior University where he earned a BS and later a MA in communications from Norwich University.

Through his father, he is a descendant of Edward Doty, a passenger of the Mayflower and one of the signers of the Mayflower Compact, through Doty's son Joseph. Coberly is a direct descendant of Noah Beauchamp, and through him John Beauchamp.

== Professional life ==
In 1973, at the age of 19, Coberly joined the U.S. Army. He served in a number of positions over the next 27 year before retiring as a sergeant major. At the time of his retirement from the military, he held the concurrent rank of an active duty Sergeant Major, and a Captain in the Army Reserves. Among his many assignments, during this period he was Senior Army Enlisted Advisor and Press Officer for the Centennial Olympic Games Joint Task Force; Media Analyst at the Supreme Headquarters Allied Powers Europe; Senior Correspondent/Chief of Bureaus, Pacific Stars and Stripes daily newspapers; Public Affairs Chief, Department of Defense 50th Anniversary Commemoration of Aviation, and the Women's Army Corps where he supported the role of women in the military. From his time in the military he was awarded the Legion of Merit and was made a member of the U.S. Army Public Affairs Hall of Fame.

After his retirement from the military from 2001 to 2003 Coberly went to work for the Space and Missile Defense Command where he was the executive officer in support of NASA's Army Astronauts. From 2003-2005 at the Huntsville International Engineering Center, he was the director of public affairs for their Huntsville Center and supported the projects worldwide such as the disposal of captured enemy ammunition in Iraq and Afghanistan, unexploded ordnance removals from former military sites, chemical demilitarization, environmental restoration, and missile defense. From 2005 to 2018, he served as a senior advisor, National Communications for the U.S. Environmental Protection Agency where he oversaw communications with the EPA worldwide research & development program.

Coberly is an active author, historian and internationally accredited journalist who has specialized in genealogy, and has written numerous newspaper and magazine articles, seven historical books and one novel.

In 2024, he was elected president of the Transatlantic Council.

== Avocation ==
Coberly, an Eagle Scout, has volunteered with the Boy Scouts of America all of his adult life. He has been awarded their highest volunteer award, the Silver Buffalo Award in recognition of his efforts. He has also worked with the Sons of the American Revolution and a number of other lineage societies from his ancestors Dr. James Stelle Coberly, Edward Doty, and others. His mother was born in Verdun, France and her parents were of Italian ancestry. Through his mother's family, he also a member of several hereditary societies in Europe.

== Awards and honors ==
- Distinguished Eagle Scout Award - 1997
- Silver Buffalo Award - 2016
- U.S. Army Public Affairs Hall of Fame - 2014
- Distinguished Conservation Service Award - 2017
- Silver Antelope Award
- Legion of Merit

== Hereditary honors ==
Titles of feudal dignity held by Daniel von Coberly von Reichenberg through his mother, Denise Maria Zagni.

- Count of Rocas, Italy, with Lordship of Maccacari annexed with hereditary titles of Patrician of Byzantium, Venice, and Verona
- Count, Baron of Villarosata, Italy, (also styled Calatorosato), Present holder of the hereditary feudal dignities of the County of Villarosata, the Barony of Villarosata
- Prince of Rome & the Lateran Palace; Gentleman of His Holiness (Count of the Lateran Palace). Marquis, Count, Baron of the Holy See.
- Hereditary Knight Commander, Order of Pope Pius IX; Knight Grand Cross & Collar, Order of Pope Pius IX, Order of St. Gregory the Great, and Order of St. Sylvester

== Published works ==
- Coberly, Daniel (2013). An Ancient and Modern History of Etruria. ISBN 978-0615819112.
- Coberly, Daniel (2015). Honor, Service, & Loyalty: A Johnson, Daniell, Lyle, Bethune, & de Loche Legacy: 800-2014. ISBN 978-0692438718.
- Coberly, Daniel (2018). The Joinville Legacy. ISBN 978-0359239795.
- Coberly, Daniel (2014). Coberly Connections: Pilgrims, Patriots & Presidents. ASIN B01K3MFNX8.
- Coberly, Daniel (2018). Almanac of Wurzburg 2018 - International Directory of Royal and Noble Houses. ISBN 978-1727138658.
- Coberly, Daniel (2019). Man on the Floor!. ISBN 978-1733945806.
- Coberly, Daniel (2019). Sovereigns, Dynasties, and Nobility. ISBN 978-1733945813.
- Kittelberger, Ken; Bearce, Doug; Coberly, Dan; Farrier, Nelson (2023). Baden-Powell Memorabilia. Vol. 1. ISBN 979-8396510661.

== See also ==
- Theodore S. Coberly
- List of Americans who held noble titles from other countries
