= Distinguished Conservation Service Award =

Scouting America conservation awards program

- Previous Name: William T. Hornaday Award
- Owner: Scouting America
- Country: United States
- Created: 1915
- Founder: William Temple Hornaday

The Distinguished Conservation Service Award (DCSA), formerly the William T. Hornaday Award, is an awards program operated by Scouting America, designed to recognize outstanding environmental stewardship and service to conservation. Three separate awards, each with different requirements, are issued to youth, adults, and organizations.

The award was created by William Temple Hornaday as the Permanent Wild Life Protection Fund Medal in 1915. After his death, the program was renamed in Hornaday’s honor in 1938 and became an official Scouting America award program. In 2020, Scouting America renamed and significantly modified the program, stating that some of Hornaday's beliefs went against the organization’s values.

The DCSA is considered to be one of the rarest awards issued by Scouting America, with just 1,200 youth medals awarded in over 100 years.

== Awards ==
=== Distinguished Conservation Service Award ===
The Distinguished Conservation Service Award is the award available to registered youth members of Scouting America. Requirements include holding the First Class rank (for Scouts BSA) and earning at least seven nature-related merit badges. Additionally, the youth must complete two conservation projects similar to the service project required for Eagle Scout.

The square knot worn by both youth and adult DCSA recipients.

=== Distinguished Conservationist Award ===
The Distinguished Conservationist Award is earned by registered adult Scouters. There are no set requirements for the award. Instead, the recipient is nominated by an environmental organization for exemplary service to conservation over a period of at least 20 years.

=== Distinguished Conservation Service Award Certificate ===
The Distinguished Conservation Service Award Certificate is issued to independent (non-Scouting) organizations and adults. Anyone may nominate a recipient for their service to youth environmental education. Only the National Council of Scouting America may receive and approve nominations.

== Recognition ==
The youth and adult DCSA medals.

Scouts who earn the DCSA receive a silver medal and embroidered square knot insignia, one of the few permitted for youth wear. Adult Distinguished Conservationists receive a gold medal and ribbon worn around the neck during special occasions.

As a result of the award’s 2024 name change, the medals for the Hornaday Award were drastically altered to be consistent with the DCSA name as well as the national organization’s rebrand to Scouting America. The green, blue, and white square knot patch remains the same.

== Previous Awards ==
There were seven different Hornaday awards before the program was reworked. Through earning one of these prestigious awards, candidates joined the ranks of Scouts, Venturers, Scouters, and organizations who have gone above and beyond in committing themselves to living with a positive environmental ethic, protecting the environment, and educating others about conservation issues we face today. Hornaday awards were administered at either the local council or national level, depending on the award.

=== Local Awards ===
==== Silver Badge ====
William T. Hornaday Silver Badge.

The Hornaday Silver Badge was awarded, upon approval of the local council, to a Scout, Venturer, or Sea Scout for outstanding service to conservation and environmental improvement. The candidate had to have been a First Class Scout, Venturer, or Sea Scout. This award included a silver badge for wear on the uniform. Approximately 2700 Scouts earned the Badge after it was introduced in 1914.

==== Gold Badge ====
The Gold Badge was awarded by nomination only and was awarded by the local council to an adult Scouter. The nominee must have demonstrated leadership and a commitment to the education of youth on a council or district level for a period of no less than three years. This award included a gold badge for wear on the uniform. Approximately 600 Scouters earned the Gold Badge after it was introduced in 2000.

==== Unit Award ====
Awarded to packs, troops, teams or crews which completed a significant conservation project with at least 60 percent of unit contributing. The unit must have written a conservation report for the project and submitted the Unit Award application to the local council. Since all unit types are eligible to earn this award (from Cub Scout Packs to Venturing Crews), spanning many different experience levels of youth, there were different expectations of youth leadership for each unit type. Approximately 1000 units earned the award after it was introduced in 1951.

=== National Awards ===
==== Youth Medals ====
The bronze and silver Hornaday Awards for youth.

These medals were awarded by the National Council for Boy Scouts, Varsity Scouts or Venturers for exceptional and distinguished service to conservation and environmental improvement. To qualify, the Scout must have completed numerous advancement requirements, and completed at least three (for the bronze medal) or four (for the silver medal) conservation projects, each from a different project category. Each project must have been significant in nature and have contributed in a long-lasting manner to conservation efforts, with the scale of each project being no less than that of an Eagle Scout Service Project. This award included a medal and square knot insignia for wear on the uniform, and a lapel pin for civilian wear. Approximately 300 Scouts earned youth medals after the requirements were clarified and updated in 1975.

==== Gold Medal ====
The gold medal was awarded by nomination only and was awarded to an adult Scouter. It was for unusual and distinguished service in natural resource conservation and environmental improvement at the regional or international level. Nominations would then be approved by the Hornaday Awards Committee and the National Conservation and Environment Task Force. Any respected conservation organization could submit a nomination. This award included a gold medal worn around the neck and square knot insignia for wear on the uniform, and a lapel pin for civilian wear. Up to six gold medals were able to be awarded per year. A total of 64 Scouters and conservation professionals earned the gold medal after it was introduced in 1974.

==== Gold Certificate ====
This award was by nomination only and was awarded to an individual, corporation, or organization. The nominee must have made an outstanding contribution to youth conservation education and demonstrated commitment to the education of youth on a national or international level, reflecting the natural resource conservation and environmental awareness mission of the Boy Scouts of America. Candidates could be nominated by any conservation or environmental organization. Up to six awards were able to be granted annually. Approximately 15 certificates were awarded to organizations after it was introduced in 1990.

== History ==
PWLPF Badge
Hornaday Badge
Hornaday Gold Badge
Hornaday Bronze Medal
Distinguished Conservation
PWLPF Medal
Hornaday Medal
Hornaday Silver Medal
Service Award
Hornaday Gold Medal
Distinguished Conservationist
Hornaday Unit Award
Hornaday Gold Certificate
Distinguished Conservation Service Award Certificate
│
1915
│
1930
│
1945
│
1960
│
1975
│
1990
│
2005
│
2020
│
2035
│
2050
│
2065
│
2080

The awards program was created to recognize those that have made significant contributions to conservation. It was established in 1915 by Dr. William T. Hornaday, director of the New York Zoological Park and founder of the National Zoo in Washington, D.C. Dr. Hornaday was an active and outspoken champion of natural resource conservation and a leader in saving the American bison from extinction. He named the award the Permanent Wild Life Protection Fund Medal. After his death in 1937, the award was renamed in Dr. Hornaday's honor and became a Boy Scouts of America award.

In 1975, an updated awards program was established with funding from DuPont. Bronze and Silver Medals were created for youth as well as a separate Gold Medal for adult Scouters and certificate for organizations. These awards continued until 2020, when Scouting America renamed and significantly modified the program, stating that some of Hornaday's beliefs went against the organization’s values. The program, now the Distinguished Conservation Service Awards, was similar to the old Hornaday Awards. The bronze and silver youth medals were replaced by a single silver medal, and the gold award and certificate were redesigned.

Since 1915, a total of 1,253 medals have been awarded (as of the end of 2019).

== Recipients ==
List of Distinguished Conservationist Award recipients

== See also ==
- Advancement and recognition in the Boy Scouts of America
- Eagle Scout
- List of environmental awards
