= List of equipment of the Angolan Army =

This is a list of equipment of the Angolan Army in service.

Many of Angola's weapons are of Warsaw Pact origin.

== Small arms ==
Name	Origin	Type	Caliber	Notes
Tokarev TT	Soviet Union	Pistol	7.62×25mm Tokarev	
Makarov PM	Soviet Union	Pistol	9×18mm Makarov	
Stechkin APS	Soviet Union	Machine pistol	9×18mm Makarov	
Škorpion	Czechoslovakia	Submachine gun	.32 ACP	
Star Z-45	Spain	Submachine gun	9×19mm Parabellum	
Sterling	United Kingdom	Submachine gun	9×19mm Parabellum	Mk 4 variant used.
Uzi	Israel	Submachine gun	9×19mm Parabellum	
FBP	Portugal	Submachine gun	9×19mm Parabellum	FBP m/948 variant used.
AK-47	Soviet Union	Assault rifle	7.62×39mm	
AKM	Soviet Union	Assault rifle	7.62×39mm	
IWI Tavor X95	Israel	Assault rifle	5.56×45mm NATO	Used by special forces.
SKS	Soviet Union	Semi-automatic rifle	7.62×39mm	
FN FAL	Belgium	Battle rifle	7.62×51mm NATO	
Heckler & Koch G3	Germany	Battle rifle	7.62×51mm NATO	
RP-46	Soviet Union	Light machine gun	7.62×54mmR	
RPD	Soviet Union	Light machine gun	7.62×39mm	
vz. 52	Czechoslovakia	Light machine gun	7.62×39mm	
DShK	Soviet Union	Heavy machine gun	12.7×108mm	
AGS-17	Soviet Union	Automatic grenade launcher	30×29mm	
RPG-7	Soviet Union	Rocket-propelled grenade	40 mm	
9K32 Strela-2	Soviet Union	Man-portable air-defense system	72 mm	
9K34 Strela-3	Soviet Union	Man-portable air-defense system	72 mm	
9K310 Igla-1	Soviet Union	Man-portable air-defense system	72 mm	

== Anti-tank weapons ==
Name	Origin	Type	Caliber	Quantity	Notes
9M14 Malyutka	Soviet Union	Anti-tank guided missile	125 mm		
B-10	Soviet Union	Recoilless rifle	82 mm	400	
B-11	Soviet Union	Recoilless rifle	107 mm	400	Serviceability doubtful.
M40	United States	Recoilless rifle	106 mm	100	

== Vehicles ==
Name	Origin	Type	Quantity	Notes
T-55	Soviet Union / Czechoslovakia	Main battle tank	200	T-55AM2 variant, serviceability doubtful.
T-62	Soviet Union	Main battle tank	50	Serviceability doubtful.
T-72	Soviet Union	Main battle tank	50	T-72M1 variant, serviceability doubtful.
PT-76	Soviet Union	Light tank	10	Serviceability doubtful.
PTL-02 Assaulter	China	Assault gun	9+	
BRDM-2	Soviet Union	Scout car	600	Serviceability doubtful.
Cayman	Belarus	Scout car	3+	
BMP-1	Soviet Union	Infantry fighting vehicle	250	Serviceability doubtful.
BMP-2	Soviet Union	Infantry fighting vehicle	250	Serviceability doubtful.
MT-LB	Soviet Union	Tracked armoured personnel carrier	31	Serviceability doubtful.
BTR-152	Soviet Union	Wheeled armoured personnel carrier	200	Serviceability doubtful.
BTR-60	Soviet Union	Wheeled armoured personnel carrier	200	Serviceability doubtful.
BTR-70	Soviet Union	Wheeled armoured personnel carrier	200	Serviceability doubtful.
BTR-80	Soviet Union	Wheeled armoured personnel carrier	200	Serviceability doubtful.
WZ-551	China	Wheeled armoured personnel carrier		Command vehicle variant.
Casspir	South Africa	MRAP	45	NG2000 variant.
BTS-2	Soviet Union	Armoured recovery vehicle	5	
Bozena	Slovakia	Mine flail		
Engesa EE-12	Brazil	Light utility vehicle		
Land Rover	United Kingdom	Light utility vehicle		
UAZ-469B	Soviet Union	Light utility vehicle		
UMM 4x4	Portugal	Light utility vehicle		
Engesa EE-15	Brazil	4×4 light truck (1.5 tonnes)		
Engesa EE-25	Brazil	6×6 medium truck (2.5 tonnes)		
Engesa EE-50	Brazil	6×6 heavy truck (5 tonnes)	255	
Mercedes Benz Unimog	Germany	4×4 truck		
GAZ-66	Soviet Union	4×4 medium truck (2 tonnes)		
Renault TRM 2000	France	4×4 medium truck (2 tonnes)	85	
ZIL-131	Soviet Union	6×6 medium truck (3.5 tonnes)		
Ural-375D	Soviet Union	6×6 medium truck (4 tonnes)		
KrAZ-6322	Ukraine	6×6 heavy truck		

== Artillery ==
Name	Origin	Type	Quantity	Notes
2S1 Gvozdika	Soviet union	122 mm self-propelled gun	9+	
2S3 Akatsiya	Soviet Union	152 mm self-propelled gun	4	
2S7 Pion	Soviet Union	203 mm self-propelled gun	12	
BM-21 Grad	Soviet Union	122 mm multiple rocket launcher	70	
RM-70	Czechoslovakia	122 mm multiple rocket launcher	40	
BM-27 Uragan	Soviet Union / Belarus	220 mm multiple rocket launcher	3+	9P140MB Uragan-M variant.
BM-24	Soviet Union	240 mm multiple rocket launcher		
D-30	Soviet Union	122 mm howitzer	523	
M-46	Soviet Union	130 mm field gun	48	
D-20	Soviet Union	152 mm gun-howitzer	4	
82-PM-41	Soviet Union	82 mm mortar	250	M43 model used.
120-PM-43 mortar	Soviet Union	120 mm mortar	500	

== Air defence systems ==
Name	Origin	Type	Caliber	Quantity	Notes
ZPU-4	Soviet Union	Towed anti-aircraft gun	14.5×114mm	450+	
ZU-23-2	Soviet Union	Towed anti-aircraft gun	23×152mmB	450+	
61-K	Soviet Union	Towed anti-aircraft gun	37 mm	450+	
AZP S-60	Soviet Union	Towed anti-aircraft gun	57 mm	450+	
ZSU-23-4 Shilka	Soviet Union	Self-propelled anti-aircraft gun	23×152mmB		
