= M274 =

M274 may refer to:

- Mercedes-Benz M270/M274 engine, an automobile engine
- M274 ½-ton 4×4 utility platform truck, U.S. military truck platform
- SMPTE 274M, a high definition video standard
