= UMM Alter 4x4 =

Overview
- Manufacturer: UMM
- Production: 1985
- Assembly: Setúbal, Portugal (Movauto)

Body and chassis
- Class: Off Road Vehicle
- Layout: FR layout/All wheel drive

Powertrain
- Engine: 2.5L 76 PS I4 Diesel
- Transmission: 4-speed manual

Chronology
- Predecessor: UMM 4x4
- Successor: UMM Alter 2000

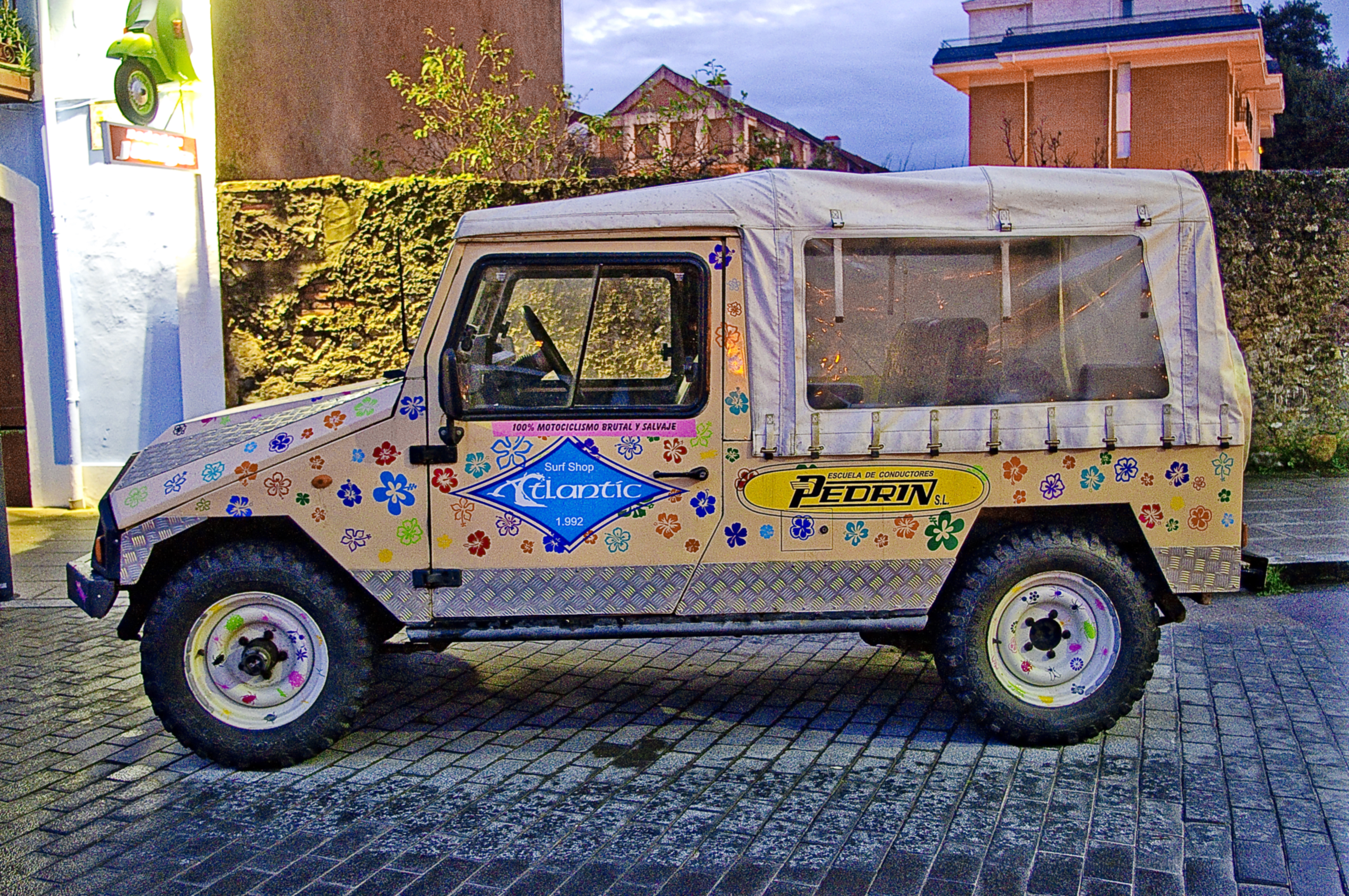
1992 UMM Alter

1985 saw the arrival of a new UMM car, the Alter 4x4, which featured a 2.5 litre diesel engine.
