= Auverland =

Automobile manufacturer

Société nouvelle des automobiles Auverland (Panhard geral defense)
- Industry: Military automobiles
- Founded: 1980
- Headquarters: Saint-Germain-Laval, France
- Key people: Christian Mons (President and CEO)
- Products: Military vehicles
- Number of employees: 300
- Website: www.auverland.com

Auverland (Société nouvelle des automobiles Auverland), now grouped with Panhard, is a French manufacturer of Jeep-like four-wheel-drive and armoured fighting vehicles. It bought Panhard from Peugeot in April 2005, and in a reverse takeover the combined company now uses the better known Panhard name.

== History ==
Created by Francois Servanin early 1980 in Saint-Germain-Laval (Loire), Auverland began licensed production of the Cournil 4x4 previously constructed in Aurillac (Cantal) beginning in 1984. Licensed production of Cournil was also taken in Portugal under the brand UMM in 1977. In 1986 Auverland presented a redesigned version, still based on the Cournil, called the A3.

Auverland almost disappeared due to diversification into civilian vehicles. In 2001, the new Society of Automotive Auverland (NAAS) was taken over by refocusing on market forces and public services (police, mounted police, firefighters ), but also recognized in competition circuits.

With the production of its small protected vehicle, "PVP", or A4VL for the French Army, has returned Auverland success and the group PSA sold the company SCMPL Panhard Auverland in January 2005.

The Auverland company was 76% owned by the Cohen family, 10% by Christian Mons, 7% by Pierre Dalmas, and 7% by the Servanins. In 2005, the company achieved a turnover of 60 million euros and had a staff of 300 employees (aggregation of entities and SCMPL NAAS).

Since 30 December 2005, the company took the name " Panhard General Defense "and expects a turnover of more than 95 million euros for 2006 and 120 million in 2007. Despite its modest size in relation to key players in the defense industry, it still ranks as Europe's leading armored wheeled vehicles under 10 tons, with the lineup the most robust market.

In October 2012, Renault Trucks Defense, division of Swedish Volvo Group since 2001, acquired Panhard for 62.5 million euros.

== Models ==
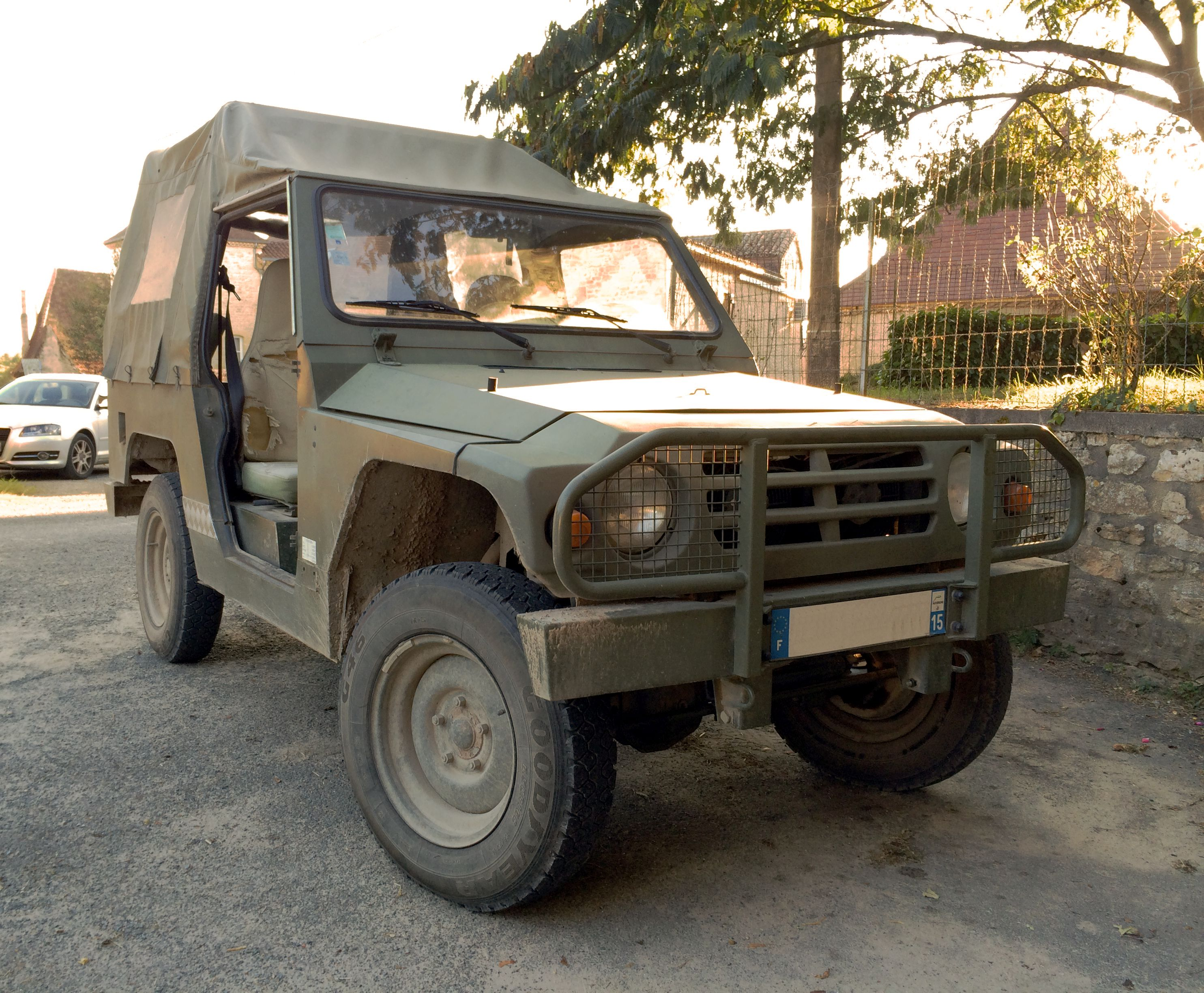
Auverland A3 Front

- A
- A2
- A3L/A3SL
- A3F
- A4
- A5
- Sovamag TC10
- Sovamag TC24

== Foreign production ==
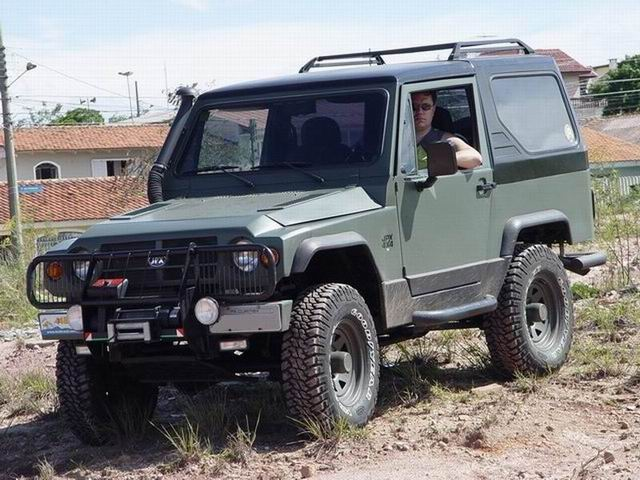
Brazilian-built JPX Montez, based on the Auverland A3

The A3 provided the basis for the Brazilian JPX Montez, which was built there from 1992 until production finally stopped in 2002.

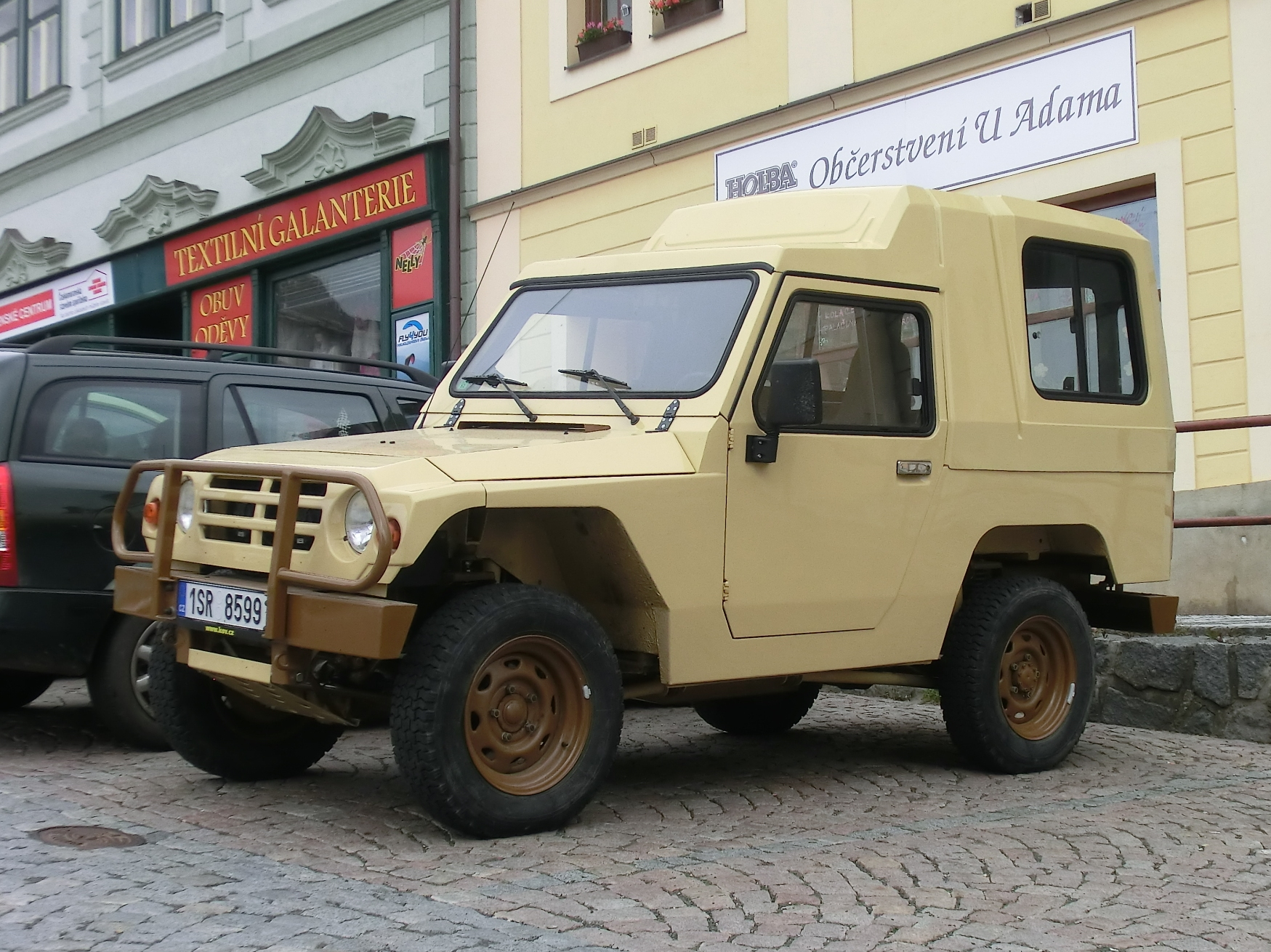
Avia 11 version of the A3

The A3 known as the Avia A11, was produced by Czech manufacturer Avia from 1994 till 1996. Avia only produced around 250 cars as the Czech Army declined the use of the A11. Hungarian bus manufacturer Ikarus intended to manufacture the Auverland A3 and A4, fitted with Peugeot petrol (2.0 L, 135 PS) or 1.9-liter diesel and turbodiesel engines. Three cars were test assembled in 2001 and two more bodies were made, before the bankruptcy of ~~Auverland~~ Ikarus brought a halt to the project.

== See also ==
- UMM
- Cournil
