= Petit Véhicule Protégé =

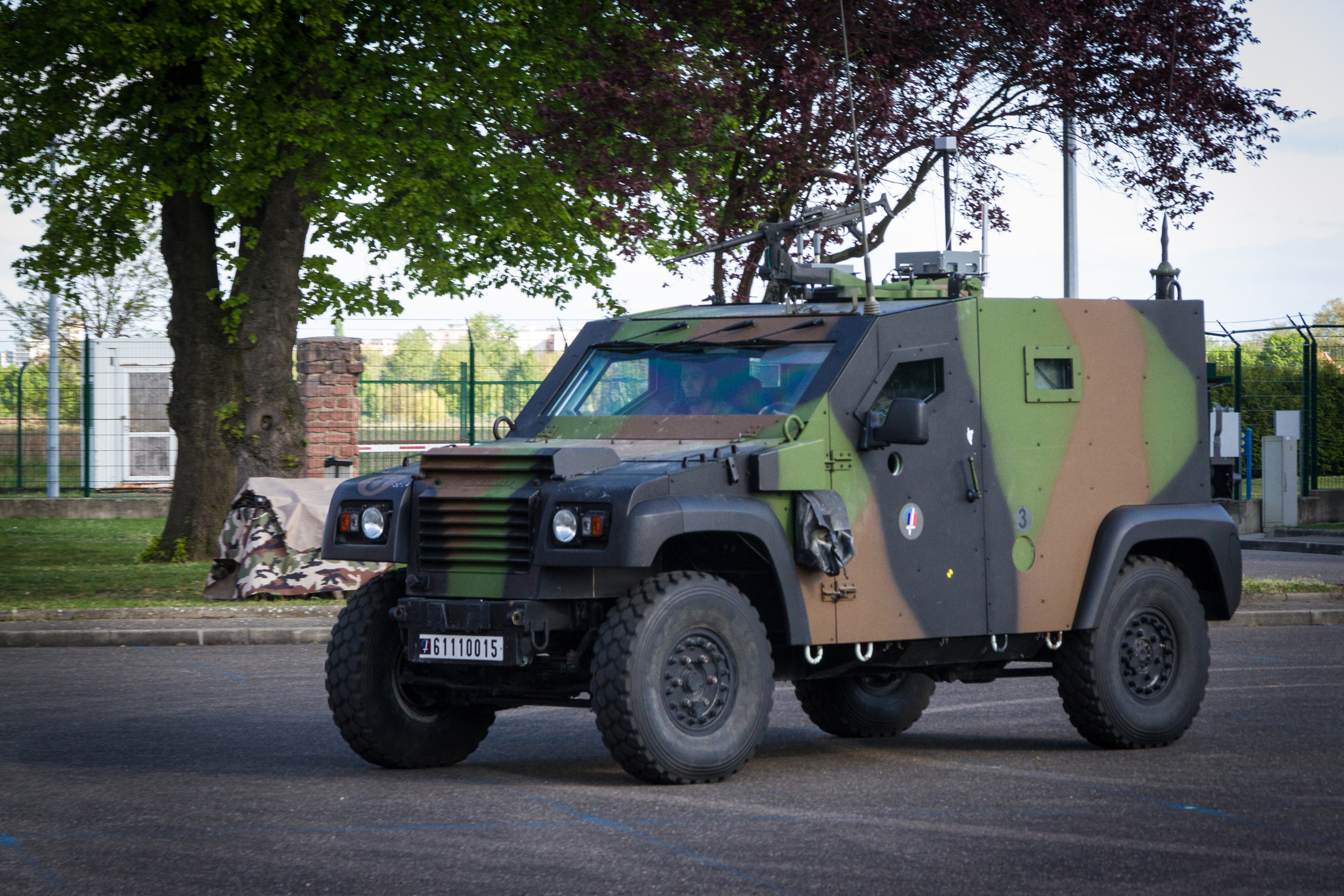
- PVP of the French army after the Bastille Day Parade (July 14, 2021)
- Type: Light armoured vehicle, military light utility vehicle, 2-door truck
- Place of origin: France

Service history
- Used by: See Operators

Production history
- Manufacturer: Panhard
- Unit cost: €167,000 (FY 2012)
- Produced: 2008–2012
- No. built: 1,133
- Variants: See Variants

Specifications
- Mass: 4,390 kg
- Length: 4.6 m (15 ft 1 in)
- Width: 2.28 m (7 ft 6 in)
- Height: 2.17 m (7 ft 1 in)
- Crew: 2 to 4
- Armour: STANAG 4569 (6 to 10 mm)
- Main armament: Medium machine gun
- Engine: IVECO 8140 2.8 litre turbo-diesel 160 hp (120 kW)
- Power/weight: 34 hp/tonne
- Suspension: Wheeled 4 x 4
- Operational range: 800 km (500 mi)
- Maximum speed: 120 km/h (75 mph)

The Petit Véhicule Protégé ("Light Protected vehicle", also Panhard PVP) is a light, general-purpose armoured 4-wheel drive vehicle used by the French Army, made by Panhard. It is also designated as Auverland A4 AVL (Armoured Vehicle Light). Built by Auverland, it is one of the successors to the Peugeot P4.

It's intended mostly as a personnel carrier, weapon carrier, and for reconnaissance, detection and communications purposes.

== History ==
In 2004, the first batch of 314 vehicles was ordered. The first vehicles were delivered in February 2008 and production ended in July 2012. 100 vehicles will be fitted with the WASP light RWS. It is expected that the French DGA will order an additional 300 PVP vehicles.

The 2009-14 military budget originally called for a total of 1500 PVPs, but this was reduced to 1233 in 2010 and 1133 in 2012. In the end, 1073 were delivered to the Army at a total cost of €242.7m (~US$325m) for a unit cost of €167,000 (~US$220,000), or €226,000 (~US$300,000) including development costs.

== Design ==
The PVP is modular, allowing extra seats to be added for more personnel or to be used as a light truck. The armour, made of steel and aluminium, offers level 2 protection (STANAG 4569) for the crew and the engine. The floor is protected against antipersonnel mines (type DM 31).

== Variants ==
- PVP HD (Heavy Duty) – larger version, based on the same architecture but with level 3 armour. With 5 doors and more cargo area (2T payload, total internal volume of 7.9 m³). Gross vehicle weight is 7.6 tonnes.
- PVP XL (Extra Large) – with a total internal volume of 9.4 m³ and a gross vehicle weight of 12 tonnes (max. payload: 3 tonnes). The maximum number of seats is 10. The basic armour of the XL model also offers a level 3 protection.
- PVP APC – Based on the French Army's PVP but with a 150mm higher roofline to provide room for 6 troops. Developed in 2010.
- Gavial – Unbuilt 5-door version with pneumatic suspension, to be licence-built by Rheinmetall. Offered to the Bundeswehr but they chose the LAPV Enok instead.
- Colt – License-built by Ashok Leyland, first revealed in 2012. Variants of the original PVP as the Colt Light Tactical Vehicle, the PVP HD as the Colt Light Armoured Vehicle and the Colt Airmobile.

== Operators ==
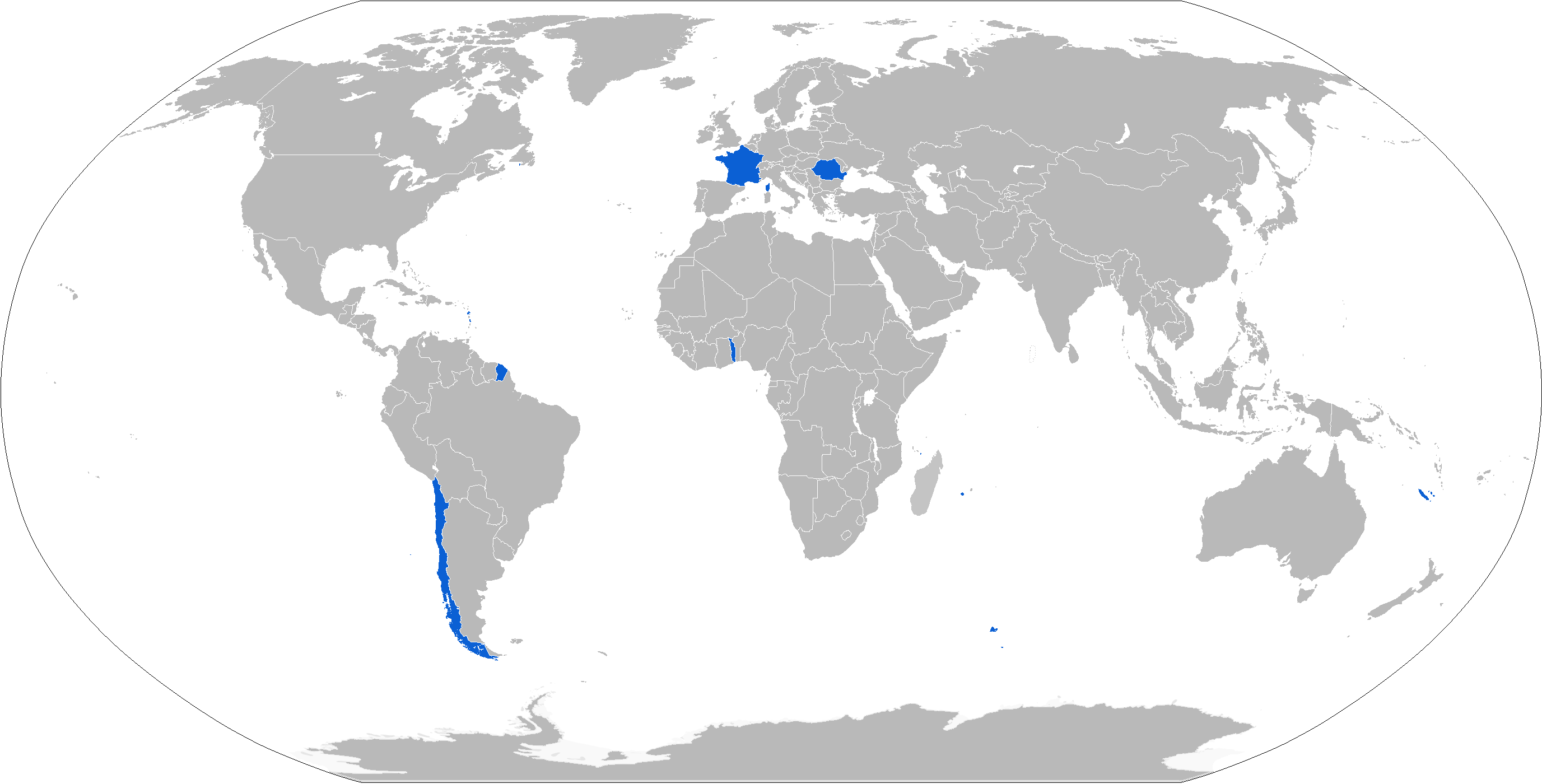
Map of PVP operators in blue

- Chile – 15 PVP delivered (Chilean Marines, Grupo de Operaciones Policiales Especiales and Control de Orden Público)
- France – 1073 PVP delivered for the French Army and French police elite unit RAID
- Mali - Said to operate an unknown number of PVPs.
- Romania – 16 PVP delivered from 2012–2015.
- Togo – 6 PVPs delivered in 2008 for Togolese forces deployed with MINURCAT.
