= União Metalo-Mecânica =

Portuguese automobile manufacturer

UMM
- Type: Division of União Metalo-Mecânica, S.A.
- Industry: Automotive
- Founded: 1977
- Headquarters: Lisbon, Portugal
- Products: Off-road vehicles
- Parent: União Metalo-Mecânica, S.A.
- Website: www.umm.pt

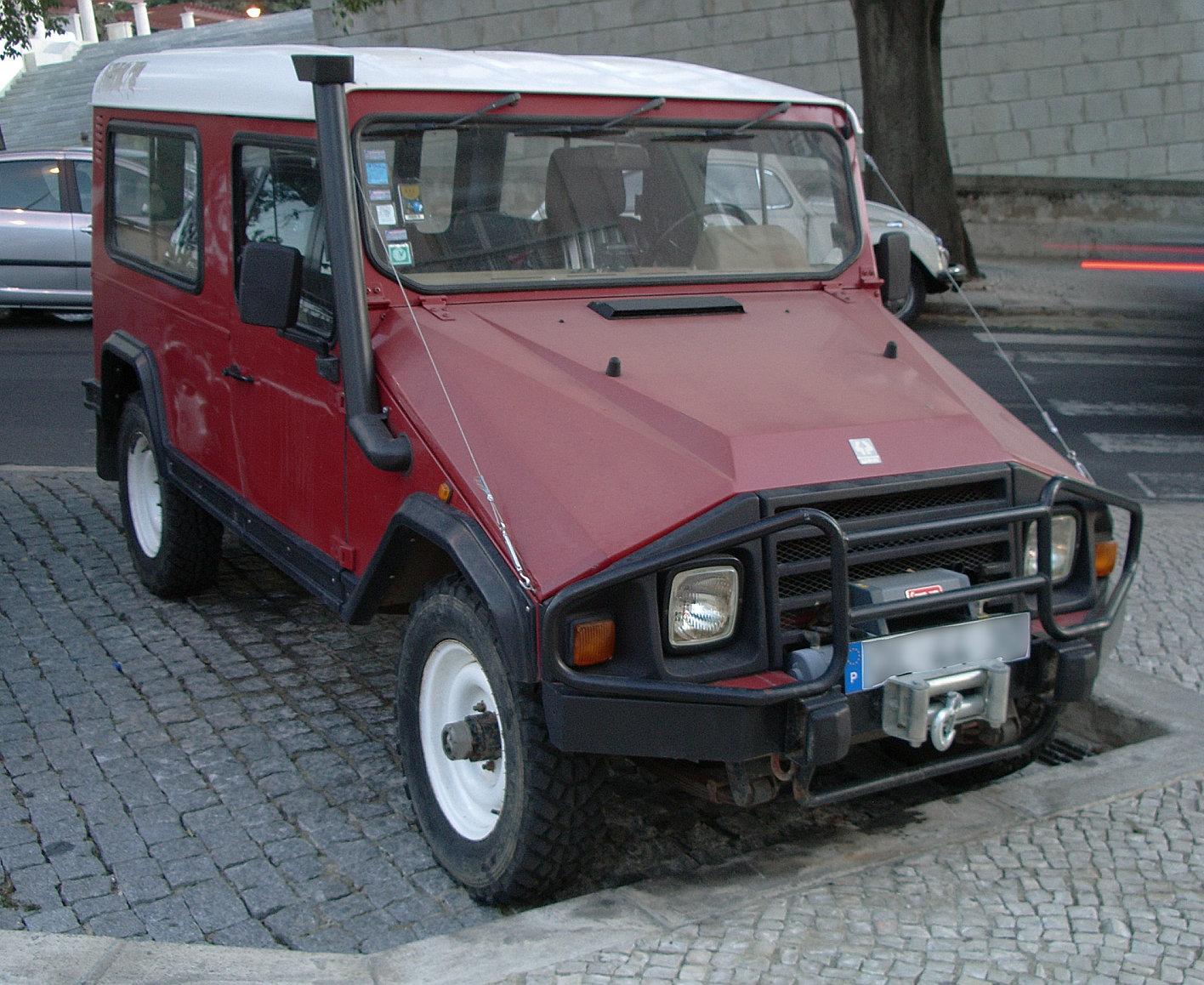
A 1990s UMM Alter 2000 Petrol 4X4

UMM (Portuguese: União Metalo-Mecânica, pronounced [uniˈɐ̃w mɨˈtalu mɨˈkɐnikɐ]) is a Portuguese metal works factory and ex-automobile manufacturer based in Lisbon, Portugal. It was founded in 1977 with the purpose of manufacturing four-wheel drive vehicles for agricultural, industrial and utility applications.

== History ==
The UMM 4x4 design is derived from a prototype created by the French engineering firm called SIMI. SIMI had produced the Cournil, a rugged two seater boxy looking Land Rover type of vehicle made with Hotchkiss-JEEP parts with Ferguson Diesel tractor allwheel driven mechanicals itself was originally designed and built by mechanical engineer Bernard Cournil. A civilian model was called the SIMI Entrepreneur 4X4. The Cournil Entrepreneur's building rights were acquired in the 1970s by the Portuguese company União Metalo-Mecânica, part of the Mocar group and were renamed as UMM.

They became known for their durability, especially when in the Paris-Dakar rally the team was able to finish with all the cars that started. Many UMMs are still in use by utilities in Spain, Portugal, Cape Verde (in use by the national army) and France and also by the "Guarda Nacional Republicana" (Portuguese Gendarmerie), fire service and military, although the majority of their customers were private individuals. Around 700 UMMs are still in service in the Democratic Republic of the Congo (Zaire). They are also popular in France and Angola.

UMM stopped building the UMM Alter II for private customers in 1994, but kept on taking large orders from military and utility services until 1996. Custom orders are no longer accepted. It is suspected that more than 10,000 UMMs were made.

The most famous UMM is probably the one that transported Pope John Paul II in one of his visits to Portugal. It was based on a 1992 five door, long wheelbase chassis from the Alter II. It featured a 40 mm armoured glass box on the rear with a chair for the Pope. It had air conditioning and outside loudspeakers connected to a microphone in the rear. Originally it had the 2.5 litre turbocharged engine, but due to safety impositions the normal 2.5 litre 76 PS (56 kW) diesel engine was fitted.

An updated version was announced in 2000, powered by a 2.1 L turbodiesel engine. This engine was less noisy and had more torque at low speed. Several options were available, including air conditioning and GPS. Price was meant to be lower than a Land Rover Defender with similar finishings. However, the company had no capital to invest in its development.

== Notable models ==
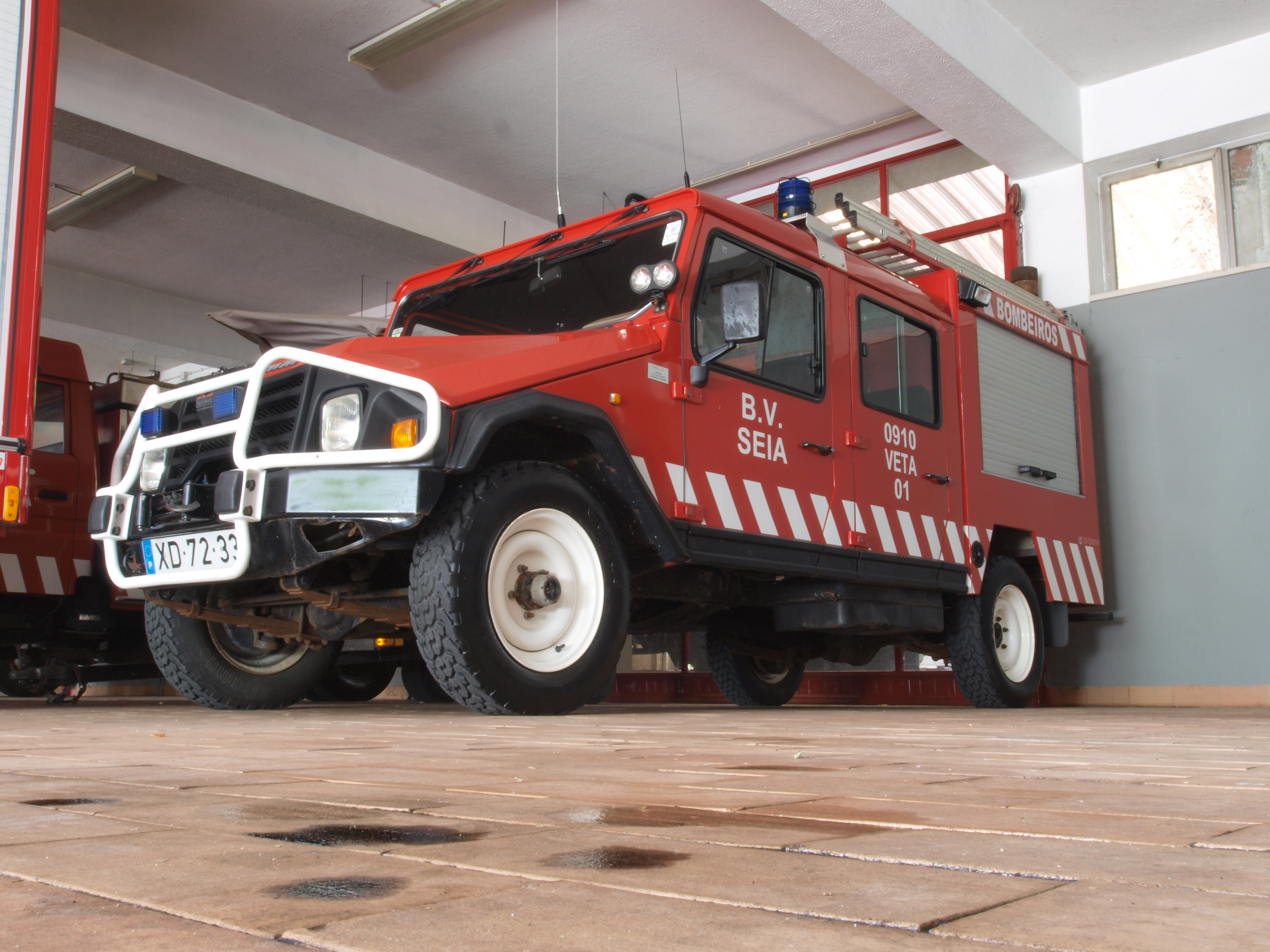
A 1990s UMM Alter 2500 Diesel 4WD Fire Engine

- UMM 4x4 Cournil (1977-1979)
- UMM 4x4 (1979-1985)
- UMM Alter (1985-1986)
- UMM Alter II Turbo Diesel 2500 (110 bhp 1986–1994)
- UMM Alter 2000 CRDI 2500 4WD (2000–2004)

The name Alter comes from the Alter Real strain of Pure Blood Lusitano horse breed.

== See also ==
- Cournil
- Auverland
- Portaro
- Paris-Dakar Rally
- Heuliez
