= M40 recoilless rifle =

M40 Recoilless Rifle
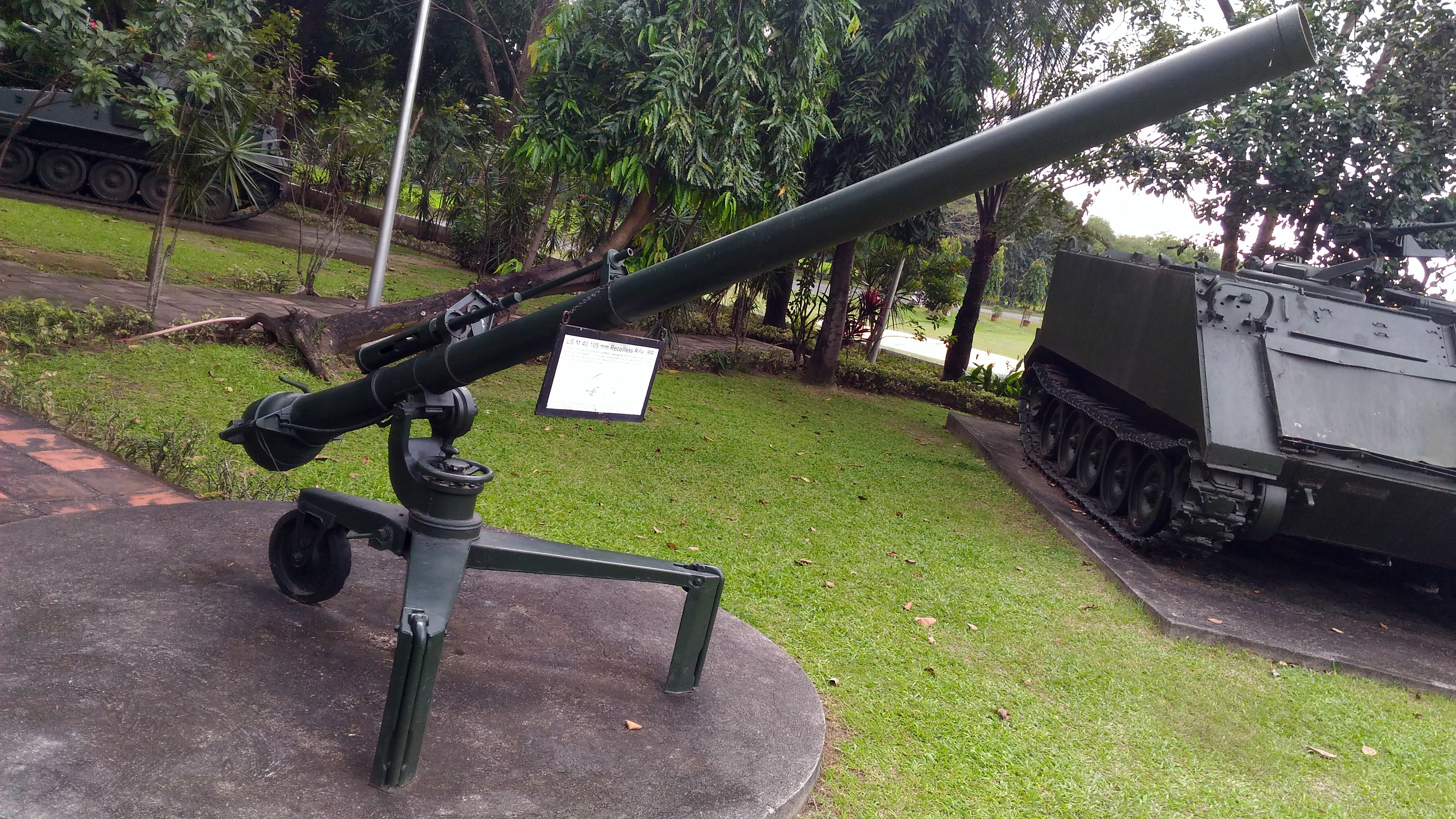
- A deactivated M40 on display at the Philippine Army Museum
- Type: Recoilless rifle
- Place of origin: United States

Service history
- In service: 1955–present
- Used by: See Users
- Wars: List of Conflicts: Vietnam War; Suez Crisis; Algerian War; Portuguese Colonial War; Cambodian Civil War; Laotian Civil War; Indo-Pakistani War of 1965; Six-Day War; Western Sahara War; Angolan Civil War; Indo-Pakistani War of 1971; Bangladesh Liberation War; Rhodesian Bush War; Nicaraguan Revolution; Third Indochina War; Soviet–Afghan War; Iran–Iraq War; Lebanese Civil War; Salvadoran Civil War; Chadian–Libyan conflict; Somali Civil War; 1989 Philippine coup d'état attempt; Gulf War; War in Afghanistan; Libyan Civil War; Syrian Civil War; War in Iraq (2013-2017); Yemeni Civil War (2014–present); 2025 Cambodia-Thailand conflict

Production history
- Manufacturer: Watervliet Arsenal

Specifications
- Mass: 209.5 kg (462 lb)
- Length: 3.404 m (11 ft 2 in)
- Height: 1.12 m (3 ft 8 in)
- Shell: 105×607mmR (HEAT, HEP, HEAP, Canister)
- Caliber: 105 mm (4.1 in)
- Recoil: Recoilless
- Carriage: Tripod
- Elevation: −17° to +65° (between mount legs) −17° to +27° (over mount leg)
- Traverse: 360°
- Muzzle velocity: 503 m/s (1,650 ft/s) (M344 HEAT)
- Effective firing range: 1,350 m (1,480 yd)
- Maximum firing range: 6,870 m (M346A1 HEP-T)

The M40 recoilless rifle is a portable, crew-served 105 mm recoilless rifle made in the United States. Intended primarily as an anti-tank weapon, it could also be employed in an antipersonnel role with the use of an antipersonnel-tracer flechette round. The bore was commonly described as being 106 mm caliber but is in fact 105 mm; the 106 mm designation was intended to prevent confusion with incompatible 105 mm ammunition from the failed M27. The air-cooled, breech-loaded, single-shot rifle fired fixed ammunition and was used primarily from a wheeled ground mount or M92 ground mount. It was designed for direct firing only, and sighting equipment for this purpose was furnished with each weapon, including an affixed M8C .50 cal spotting rifle.

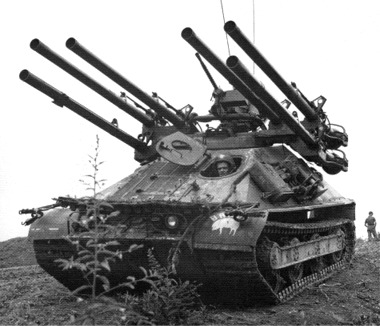
Ontos M50A1 with six 105 mm M40A1 recoilless rifles

297 M50 "Ontos" were built as self-propelled light armored tracked anti-tank vehicles. They had six 105 mm M40 recoilless rifles as their main armament, which could be fired in rapid succession against a single target to guarantee a kill. The M40 could also be used on the M274 4×4 utility platform "mechanical mule."

Replacing the M27 recoilless rifle, the M40 primarily saw action during the Vietnam War and was widely used during various conflicts thereafter in Africa or in the Middle East. It was also used to great effect by both sides in the 1971 India-Pakistan War. It was primarily replaced by the BGM-71 TOW anti-tank missile system in the US Armed Forces.

== Design history ==
The earlier M27 recoilless rifle was a 105 mm weapon developed in the early 1950s and fielded in the Korean War. Although a recoilless rifle of this caliber had been a concept since the Second World War, the weapon was hurriedly produced with the onset of the Korean War. The speed with which it was developed and fielded resulted in problems with reliability caused by trunnions that were mounted too far to the rear. The M27 was also considered too heavy by the U.S. Army and had a disappointing effective range due to the lack of a spotting rifle. Taking the M27 as the basis for a new design, the Army developed an improved version of the M27 that was type-designated the M40 106-mm recoilless rifle in 1955. Although unsuitable for military purposes, M27 recoilless rifles were used to trigger controlled avalanches at ski resorts and mountain passes in the United States.

== Description ==
The M40 is shaped like a long tube with an M8C .50 cal spotting rifle above. The spotting rifle fires a round whose trajectory closely matches that of the 105 mm round and gives off a puff of smoke on impact with the target. On the left side, there is an elevating wheel, in the center of which is the trigger wheel used to fine adjust the elevation and at the same time firing the spotting rifle when pulled, and the gun when pushed. The mounting is a tripod, but the front leg has a castering wheel. On top of the mount is a traverse wheel. On the center of the traverse wheel is a locking wheel, when the wheel is down, the rifle is locked in traverse, and can only be moved right and left with the traverse wheel. When the wheel is raised, the rifle can be traversed by hand. Austria produced a two-wheeled mount for the M40.

The whole mounting can be placed on an M151 Jeep for mobile use. It has also been mounted on M113s, UMM 4x4s, Jongas, Fath Safirs, Land Rover Defenders, Mercedes-Benz G-Wagen, Hotchkiss M201 jeeps, Toyota Land Cruisers, Willys M38s, HMMWVs, M274 Mechanical Mules, Tiuna 106 mm weapons platforms, JODDB (formerly King Abdullah II Design and Development Bureau) Al Jawad vehicles, RBY MK 1s, AIL Abirs and AIL Storms. They were also used on US Navy minesweepers (MSO) during Operation Market Time in Vietnam.

A special vehicle called the Ontos carried six M40s. A version specific to the T195E5 mount, the M40A1C, was used. It was used only by the U.S. Marine Corps. Some Pakistani M113s have a dual mounting. Three Panagopoulos coastal patrol boats class of the Hellenic Coast Guard and the Hellenic Navy in service of 1976-2003 was armed with two sextuples M40.

The M40 was widely exported and remains in service with numerous nations, including South Korea, Ecuador, Estonia, Greece, Honduras, Iran, Lebanon, Malaysia, Mexico, Morocco, the Philippines, Taiwan, Thailand, Turkey, Colombia, and Venezuela. It was also utilized by various anti-government forces during the Libyan and Syrian civil wars.

== Non-US production ==
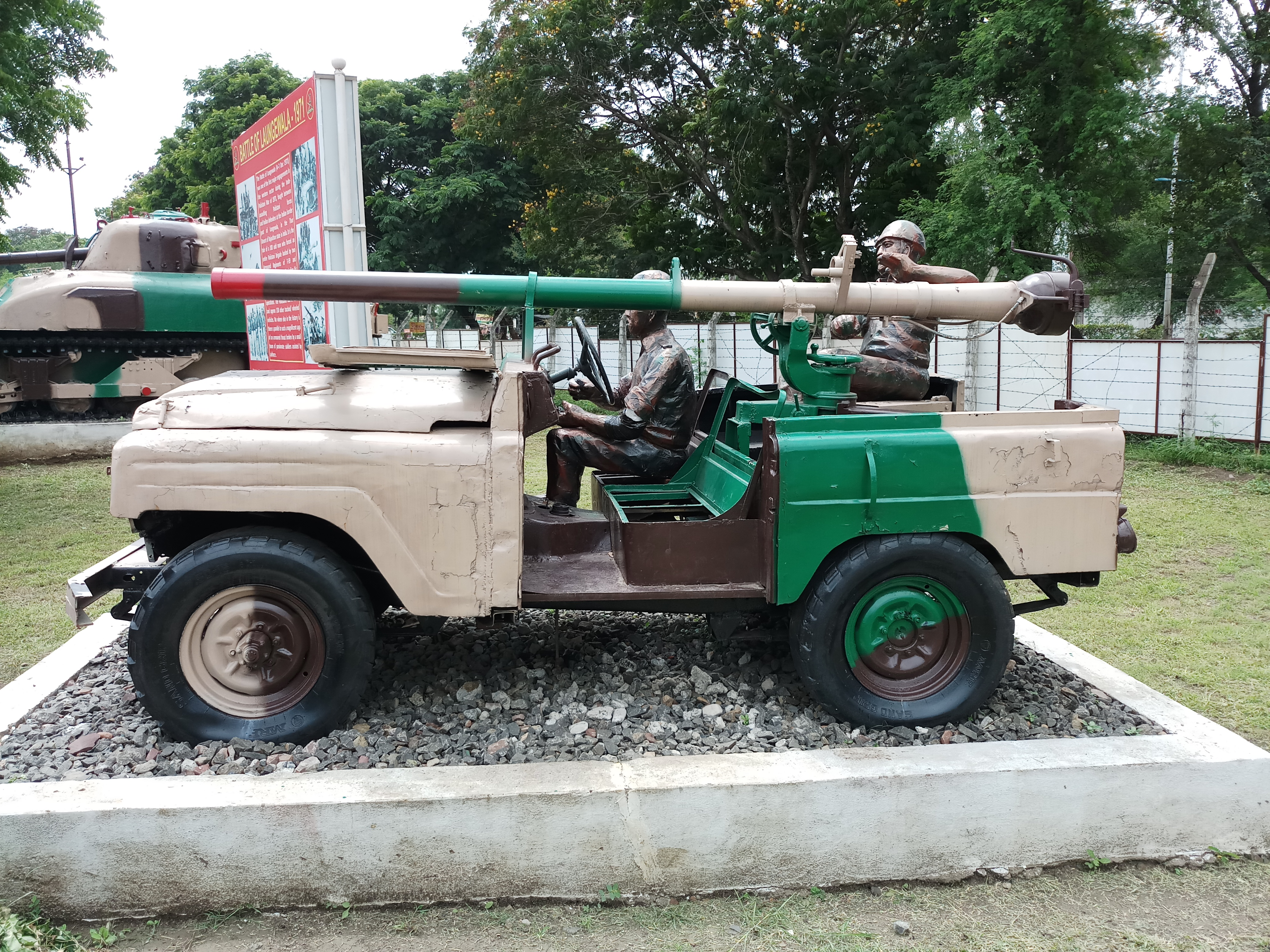
Jonga mounted with a 105 mm RCL gun, a combination which destroyed many tanks during the Indo-Pakistani war of 1965 and Indo-Pakistani war of 1971

Country	Producer	Local name	Remarks
Austria	Lohner GmbH	10.6 cm rPAK M40A1	Locally produced carriage
China	Norinco	Type 75	Towed and SP versions
India	Ordnance Factory Board		Mounted on tripods or on Jongas
Iran	Defense Industries Organization		
Japan	Japan Steel Works	Type 60	
Pakistan	Pakistan Machine Tool Factory Limited		
South Korea	Kia Machine Tool Company	KM40A2	
Spain	Santa Bárbara Sistemas	CSR-106	

== Ammunition ==
Ammunition for the 105 mm rifle was issued as one-piece fixed cartridges. The term "fixed" means that the projectile and the cartridge case are crimped together. This ensures correct alignment of the projectile and the cartridge case. It also permits faster loading because the projectile and the cartridge case are loaded as one unit. The rear end of the cartridge case is perforated, to allow the propellant gas to escape through the vented breech, thus neutralizing recoil. Most projectiles (except HEAT) used are pre-engraved, that is, the rotating bands are cut to engage the rifled bore.

Types of ammunition included HEAT, High Explosive Plastic-Tracer (HEP-T), canister, High Explosive Anti Personnel, and the M368 dummy round which could not be fired and was used for crew drill. The original U.S. HEAT round penetrated more than 400 mm of armor. Near the end of the M40's service life, both Austria and Sweden produced HEAT rounds for the weapon capable of penetrating more than 700 mm of armor.

Producer	Round name	Type	Proj Weight	Proj Filler	Filler weight	Armor penetration	Effective range
United States	M494	APERS-T	N/A	N/A	N/A	N/A	300 m
United States	M581	APERS	9.89 kg	flechettes	4.94 kg	N/A	300 m
Spain	M-DN11	HEAP	3.6 kg	Hexogen	0.77 kg	N/A	1500 m
West Germany	Diehl 106 mm	Fragmentation	8 kg	steel balls	3.5 kg	N/A	N/A
France	NR 160	HEAT-T	N/A	N/A	N/A	N/A	N/A
France	NR 483	APERS	N/A	flechettes	N/A	N/A	N/A
France	NR 601	HESH-T	7.8 kg	Comp. A3	N/A	N/A	N/A
Italy	PFF	HE	9.89 kg	Comp. B	N/A	N/A	N/A
United States	M346A1	HEP-T	7.96 kg	Comp. A3	3.5 kg	N/A	N/A
United States	M344A1	HEAT	7.96 kg	Comp. B	1.27 kg	over 400 mm	1350 m
Pakistan	M344A1 type round	HEAT	6 kg	N/A	N/A	500 mm	2012 m
India	?	HEAT	16.78 kg (round)	N/A	N/A	600 mm	1372 m
Sweden	106 3A	HEAT-T	5.5 kg	Octol	1.0 kg	over 700 mm	2000 m
Austria	RAT 700	HEAT	5.0 kg	N/A	1.1 kg	over 700 mm	N/A
Austria	3.1 RAT 700	HEAT-T	5.7 kg	Octastit	1.1 kg	over 700 mm	N/A

=== Spotting rifle ===
The ammunition for the M8C spotting rifle is not .50 BMG, but a 22mm shorter (12.7x77mm) round than used in .50 caliber machine guns. The spotter round was developed to replicate the trajectory of the 106 mm ammunition, and features a tracer element and a point-detonating incendiary filler to create a puff of white smoke at the impact point. Four of the six 106mm rifles on the M50 Ontos mounted spotter rifles. Spotter rounds had a yellow tip with a red band and practice cartridges had a green tip.

Although the spotting rifle could conceivably be used in an antipersonnel role, historic U.S. military doctrine strongly discouraged this use, for a purely tactical reason—to conceal the vulnerable M40 and its crew from the enemy until the main rifle was ready to fire. However, this restriction is believed to be the source of a long-standing misconception that the laws of war restrict the use of .50-caliber projectiles against enemy personnel more generally.

== Civilian use ==
In the early 1990s, the United States Forest Service (USFS) introduced the M40 for avalanche control as ammunition stocks for its M27 rifles became depleted. The M40 was initially successful due to operational similarities to the familiar M27 and ready availability from the U.S. military; however, in 1995, a USFS gunner was killed by shrapnel after a low-level premature warhead detonation inside an M40 barrel. The accident was attributed to an undiscovered hairline crack in the projectile's base plate. Following this incident, most USFS M40s were quickly replaced with surplus 105 mm howitzers, but a few were kept in service with safety barriers to protect the gunners, who fired the guns remotely. In December 2002, two M40s at Mammoth Mountain were destroyed by catastrophic bore explosions 13 days apart. The gunners were uninjured, having been protected by the safety barriers, but the incidents prompted the USFS to retire all remaining M40s in July 2003.

== Users ==
Map with M40 recoilless rifle users in blue

- Angola: used by mercenaries of FNLA on Land Rovers and by UNITA.
- Australia: replaced the 6-pdr gun from 1961. Remained in service into the 1990s and in limited use in Afghanistan.
- Austria: Locally produced as 10.6 cm rPAK M40A1
- Bahrain: 25 M40A1s as of 2016
- Bangladesh: 238 M40A1s as of 2016
- Bolivia
- Brazil: 194 M40A1s as of 2016
- Burkina Faso
- Cambodia
- Cameroon: 40 M40A2s as of 2021
- Canada
- Central African Republic: 14 as of 2016
- Chad
- Chile: 213 M40A1s as of 2016
- China: Locally produced as Type 75
- Colombia: 73 M40A1s as of 2016
- Comoros
- Democratic Republic of the Congo
- Cyprus: 144 M40A1s as of 2016
- Denmark: remained in limited service in Afghanistan.
- Djibouti: 16 M40A1s as of 2021
- Dominican Republic: 20 M40A1s as of 2016
- Ecuador: 24 M40A1s as of 2016
- Egypt
- El Salvador: 20 M40A1s as of 2016, including some Spanish-made guns
- Estonia: 30 M40A1s as of 2016
- France
- Gabon
- Guatemala: 56 M40A1s as of 2016, including some Spanish-made guns
- Greece: 581 M40A1s as of 2016
- Haiti
- Honduras: 50 M40A1s as of 2016, including some Spanish-made guns
- India: M40A1C locally produced. More than 3,000 in service as of 2016
- Indonesia
- Iran: Locally produced. ~200 M40s in service
- Iraq
  - Kurdistan
- Islamic State
- Israel
- Italy
- Ivory Coast: ~12 M40A1s as of 2016
- Japan: Locally produced by Japan Steel Works as Type 60
- Jordan
- Laos
- Lebanon: 113 M40A1s as of 2016
  - Lebanese Forces
- Lesotho: 6 M40s as of 2021
- Liberia
- Libya: American, Chinese and Iranian variants
- Luxembourg
- Madagascar
- Malaysia: 24 M40s as of 2016
- Mauritania: ~90 M40A1s as of 2016
- Mexico - including some Spanish-made guns
- Morocco: 350 M40A1s as of 2016
- Myanmar: more than 1,000 M40A1 RCLs in service as of 2016, including Spain made CSR-106s and Pakistani-made M40A1s. used for bunker busting and anti-personnel/infantry support role in counter-insurgency campaigns.
- Netherlands
- New Zealand
- Nicaragua
- Niger: 8 M40s as of 2016
- Nigeria
- Norway - Identified as 106mm Rekylfri Kanon M40
- Pakistan: Locally produced. Still in service as of 2020
- Peru
- Philippines
- Portugal: 45 M40A1s as of 2016
- Rhodesia
- Saudi Arabia
- Singapore: 90 M40A1s as of 2016
- Somalia Transferred from Yemen
- South Africa: South African National Defence Force.
- South Korea: Locally produced. Still in service in 2016.
- Vietnam
- Spain: Locally produced by Santa Bárbara Sistemas as CSR-106
- Sri Lanka: ~30 as of 2016
- Sudan: 40 M40A1s as of 2016. Also used some Chinese Type 75s, some being captured by the Sudan People's Liberation Army
- Suriname
- Switzerland: In the period 1958–1990, the antitank companies of the Swiss Army Infantry Regiments were equipped with 12 M40 guns.
- Syria: used by the Free Syrian Army and Syrian Army.
- Taiwan
- Thailand: 150 M40s as of 2016, still in service as of December 2025.
- Tunisia
- Turkey: 2,329 M40A1s as of 2016
- Uruguay: 69 M40A1s as of 2016
- United Arab Emirates: 12 M40s as of 2016
- United Kingdom: used by Airborne Forces from 1956 until the mid 1960s. Credited with the destruction of an Egyptian SU100 during the Suez Crisis
- United States
- Venezuela: 175 M40A1s as of 2016
- Yemen
- Zimbabwe

== Gallery ==
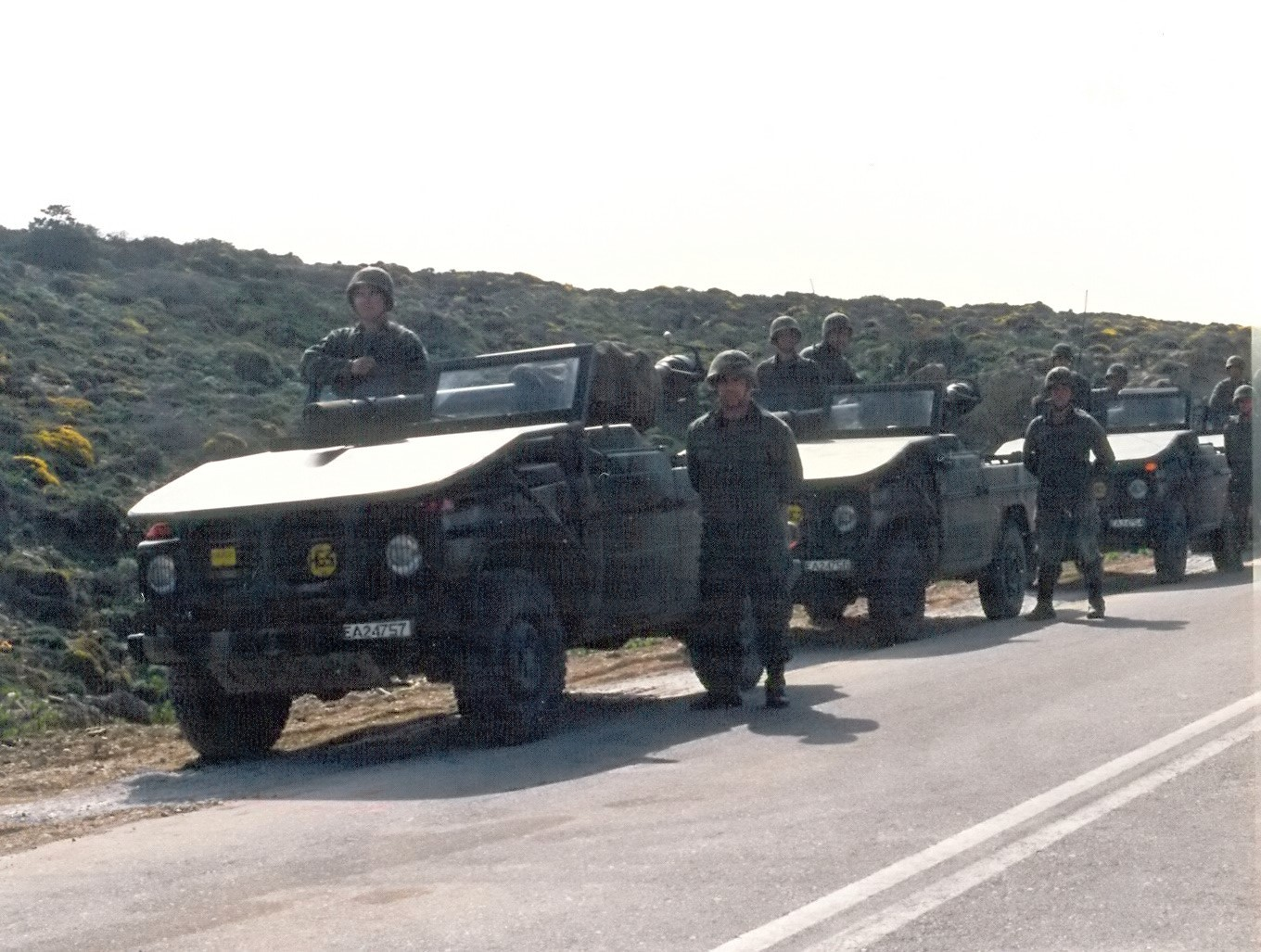
Greek Mercedes-Benz 240G M40 carrier. Note the metal guard to protect the engine from the gun blast.

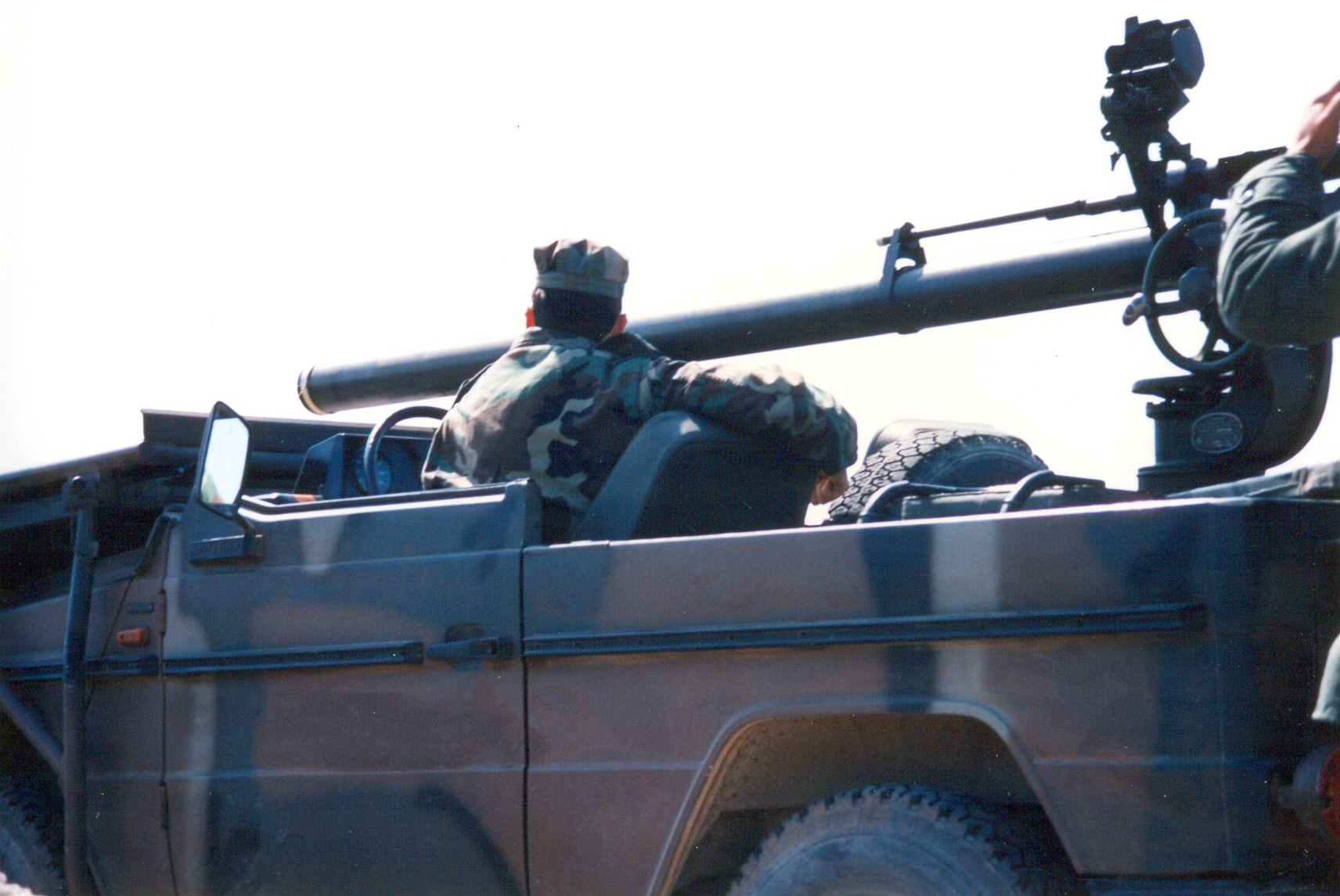
Firing the gun from a Mercedes-Benz 240G.

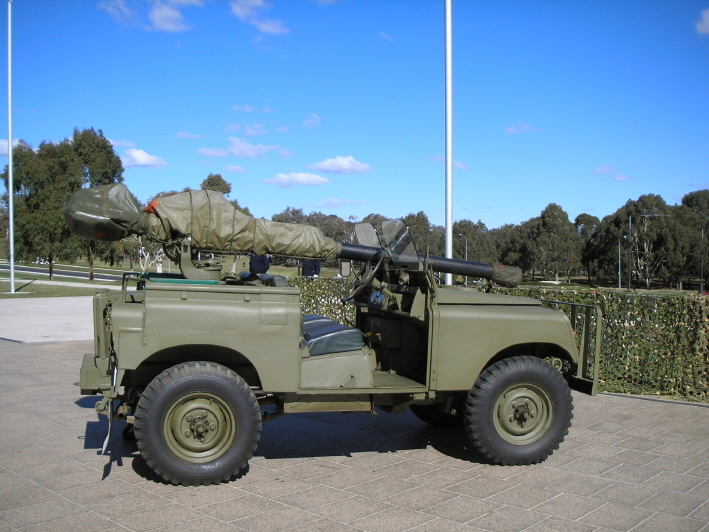
An ex-Australian Army M40 recoilless rifle mounted on a Land Rover on display in the grounds of the Australian War Memorial.

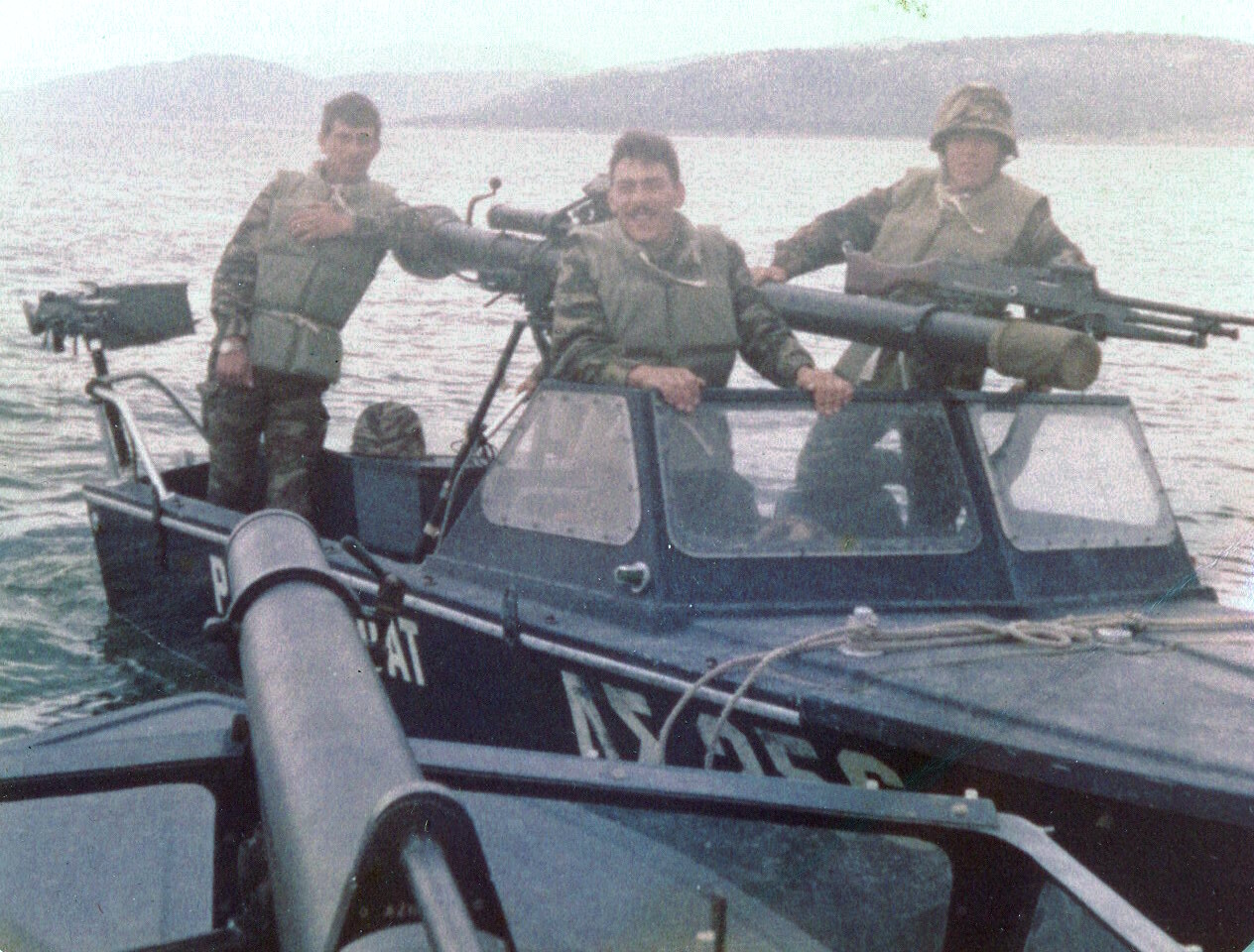
A rather uncommon use of the M40 on a Greek fast patrol boat, circa 1982.

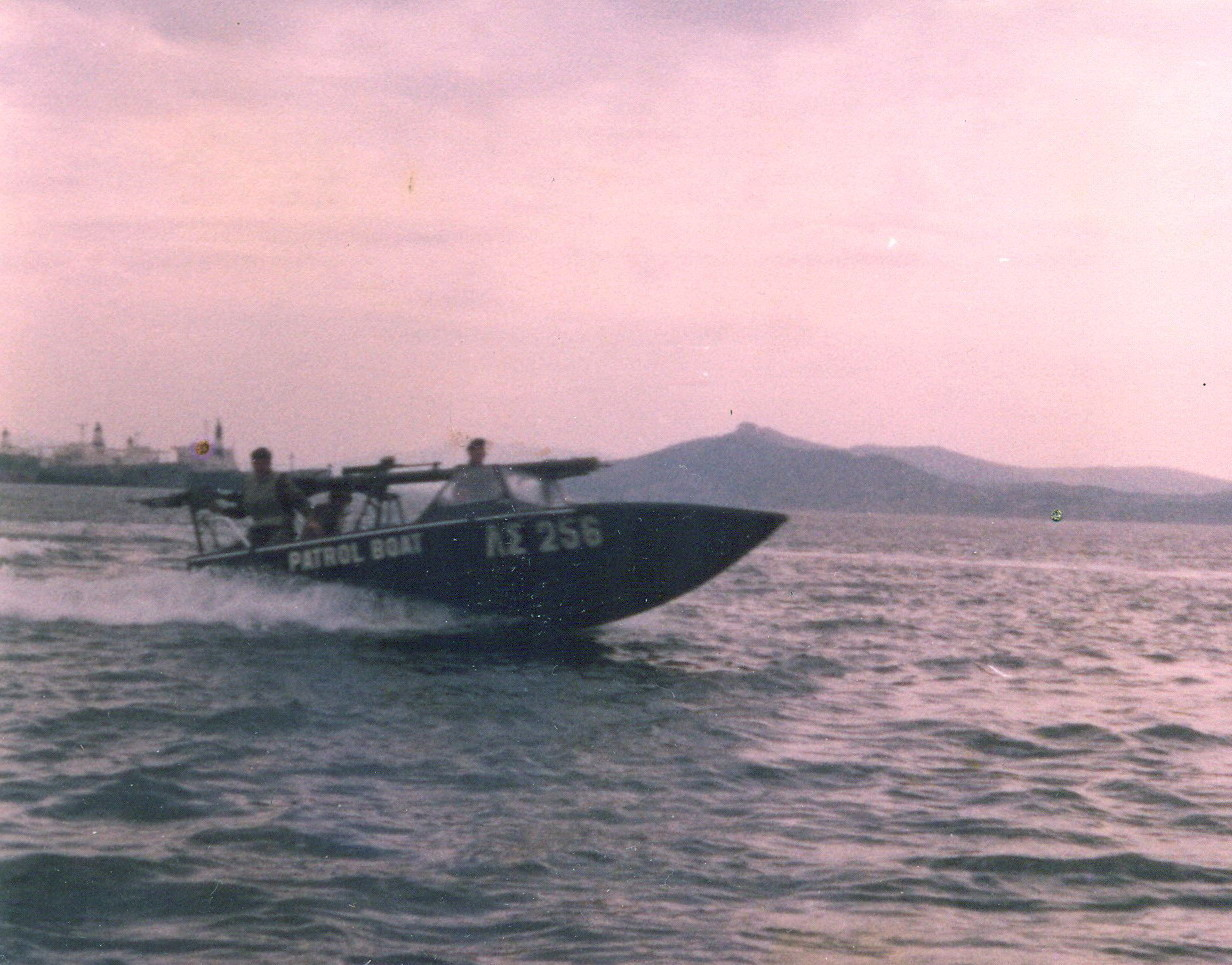
The same Greek fast patrol boat.

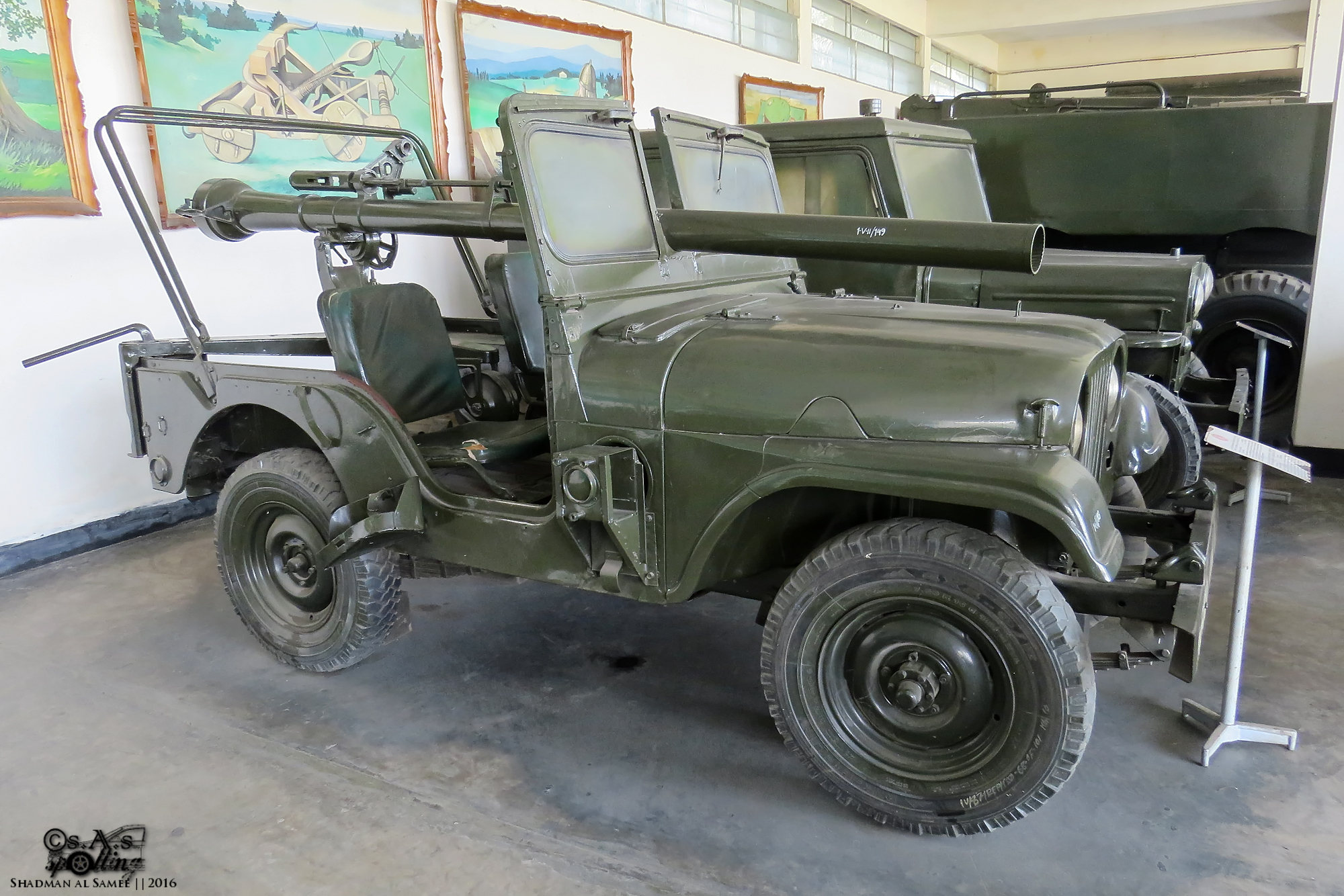
A Pakistan Army (Obtained from the Pakistan Army in 1971 war) M40 recoilless rifle mounted on a Willys Jeep M38A1 on display in the Bangladesh Military Museum.

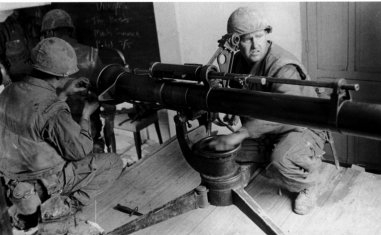
U.S. Marines manning an M40 during the Battle of Huế in the Vietnam War.

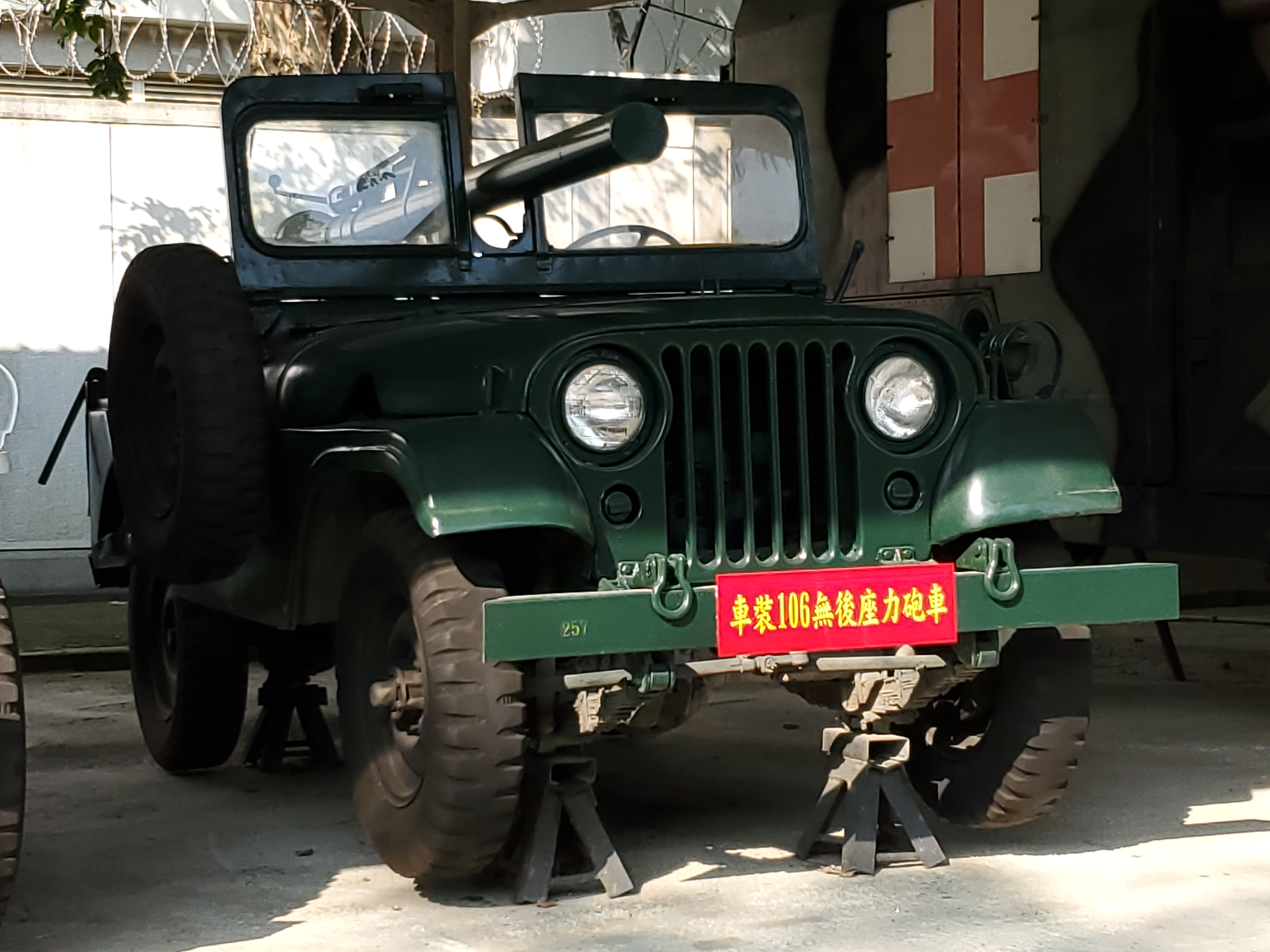
Willys M38A1C equipped M40 recoilless gun, used by the Taiwanese marines.

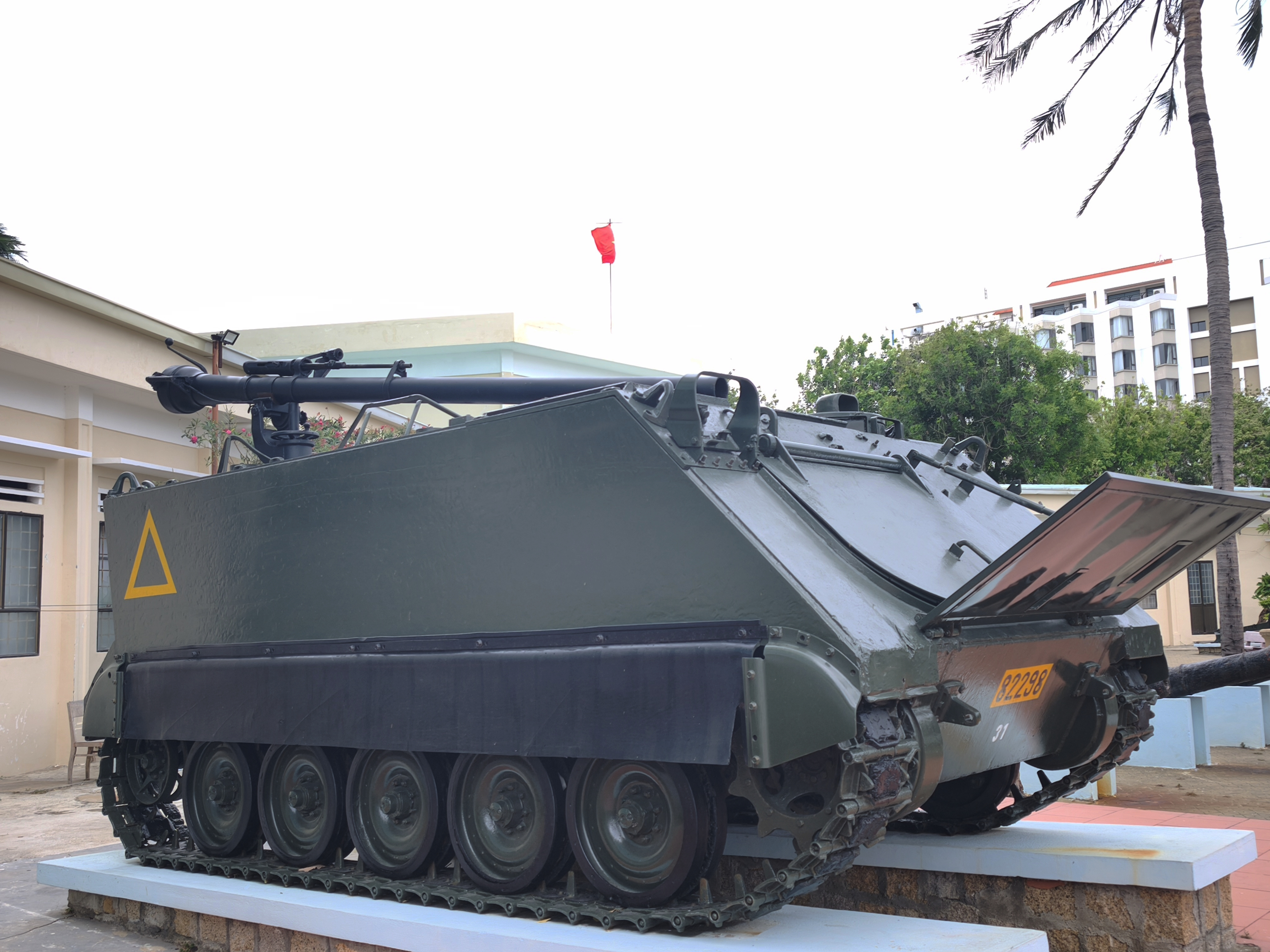
M113 with M40 recoilless rifle used during the Vietnam War

== See also ==
- List of U.S. Army weapons by supply catalog designation (SNL C-93)
- M18 recoilless rifle – (United States)
- M20 recoilless rifle – (United States)
- Pansarvärnspjäs 1110 – (Sweden)
- List of weapons of the Lebanese Civil War
- List of weapons of the Cambodian Civil War
- List of weapons of the Laotian Civil War
- Weapons of the Salvadoran Civil War
