= UMM 4x4 =

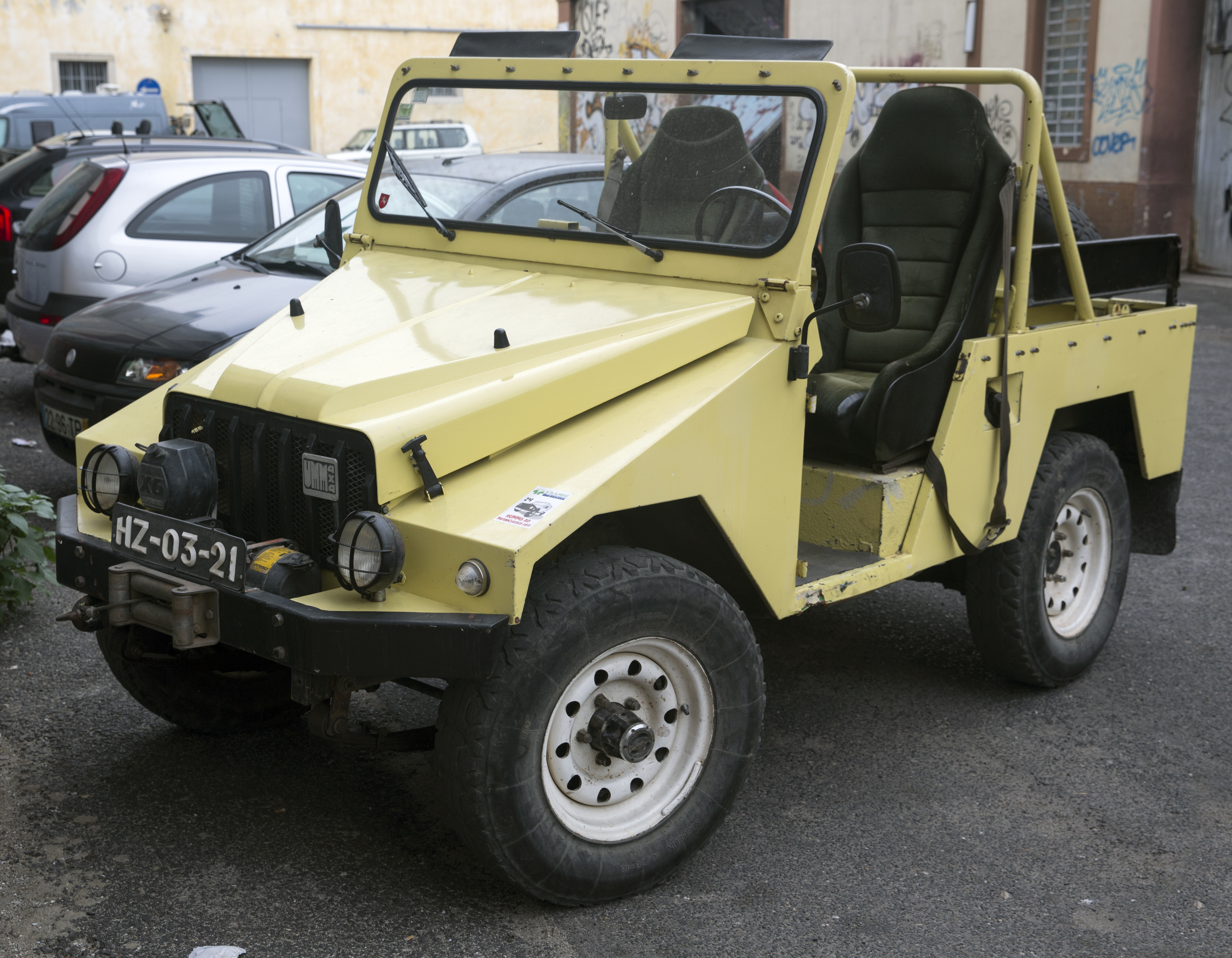

Overview
- Manufacturer: UMM
- Production: 1979-1984
- Assembly: Setúbal, Portugal (Movauto)

Body and chassis
- Class: Off Road Vehicle
- Layout: FR layout/All wheel drive

Powertrain
- Engine: 2.1L 62 PS diesel I4; 2.3L 66,5 PS diesel I4
- Transmission: 4-speed manual

Chronology
- Successor: UMM Alter 4x4

== Early history ==
The French-built UMM 4x4 Cournil was launched in Portugal by Portuguese car maker UMM in 1977. It was designed by the French engineer, Bernard Cournil mainly for agricultural and industrial issues. It was powered by an Indenor-Peugeot 2.1 l diesel engine matched to a 4-speed manual gearbox made also by Peugeot. The transfer case was built in-house. It was available in three versions: Randonneur (only 4 or 5 are known to exist in Portugal), Tracteur (pick-up version of the Randonneur) and the much more common Entrepreneur stretched larger version. UMM had the sales rights to the Cournil outside of France, and later took over production entirely.

== UMM is born ==
In 1979 UMM began Portuguese production of a gently restyled UMM 4x4 Cournil with a 2.1 Litre Diesel engine. It dropped the Cournil designation and was available with new equipment. There was only one trim: the Entrepreneur.

In 1981, plastic rear view mirrors were introduced. In 1982, it featured bigger doors and a new Indenor-Peugeot 2.3 Litre Diesel engine. In 1983, the transmission was switched to a four-speed ZF unit.
