= UMM Alter 2000 =

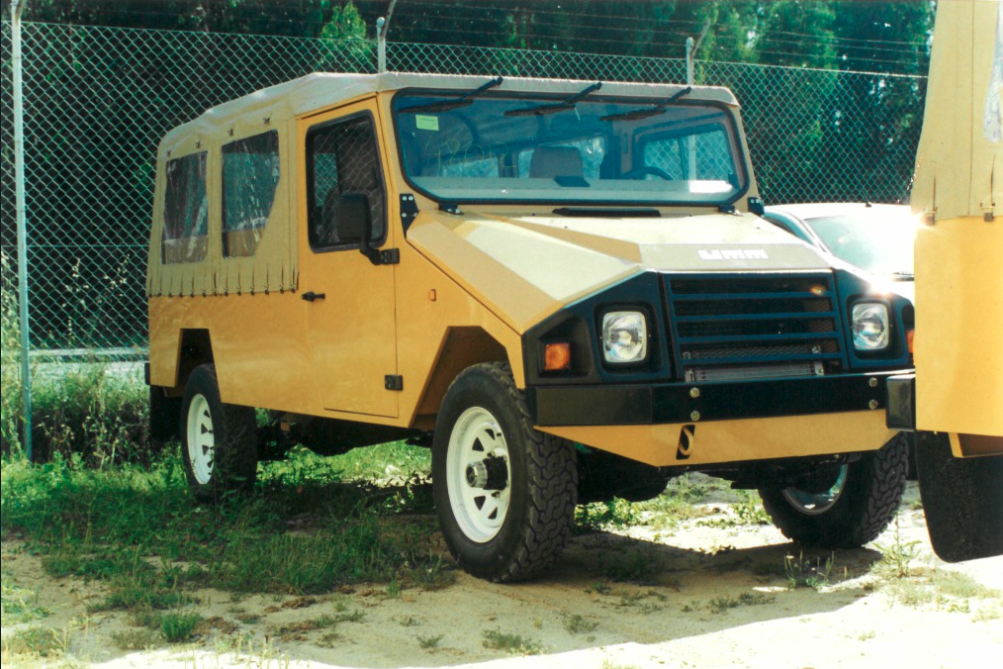

Overview
- Manufacturer: UMM
- Production: 2000–2004

Body and chassis
- Layout: 4x4

Powertrain
- Engine: Diesel: 2088 cc XUD11BTE turbo I4
- Transmission: 5-speed manual BA10/5

Dimensions
- Width: 1,690 mm (66.5 in)
- Height: 1,955 mm (77.0 in)
- Curb weight: 2,720 kg (5,997 lb)

In the year 2000, UMM launched a new version of the Alter, the Alter 2000. Equipped with a 2.1-litre Turbo Diesel engine built by Peugeot, this engine was quieter, more fuel-efficient, and delivered higher torque than the previous versions.

Externally, the vehicle retains the look of earlier Alter models, with fixed panels near the heater and handbrake area similar to the 1993 version. However, several structural changes were made: the chassis rails in the engine compartment were built from bent sheet metal, and the passenger-side footwell was narrowed. These modifications were necessary to accommodate the new 2.1-litre engine.

Additionally, the rear chassis crossmember (rear skid plate) was different from earlier versions. This change was likely intended to improve passenger access, as the step surface was wider.

Inside, the dashboard was completely redesigned using bent metal, giving it a more rugged and functional appearance. The transfer case and front axle engagement levers were also repositioned closer to the main gear shift lever.

All these changes are documented through images available in the gallery.

As of 2025, there are 21 long wheelbase units ("Lungo") known to exist in Portugal, and 5 short wheelbase units ("Curto") are known, two of which are located in France.

== Engine ==
The Alter 2000 was only available with a 2.1-litre, indirect injection, 12-valve turbo-diesel engine producing 110 PS (81 kW). This engine was also used in models like the Peugeot 406, Peugeot 605, and the Citroën XM.

== Transmission ==
The vehicle used the 5-speed Peugeot BA10/5 gearbox, featuring different gear ratios from earlier Alter versions.

== Axles ==
The drivetrain included a front Dana 30 axle and a rear Dana 44 axle, without a limited-slip differential (LSD).

== Gallery ==
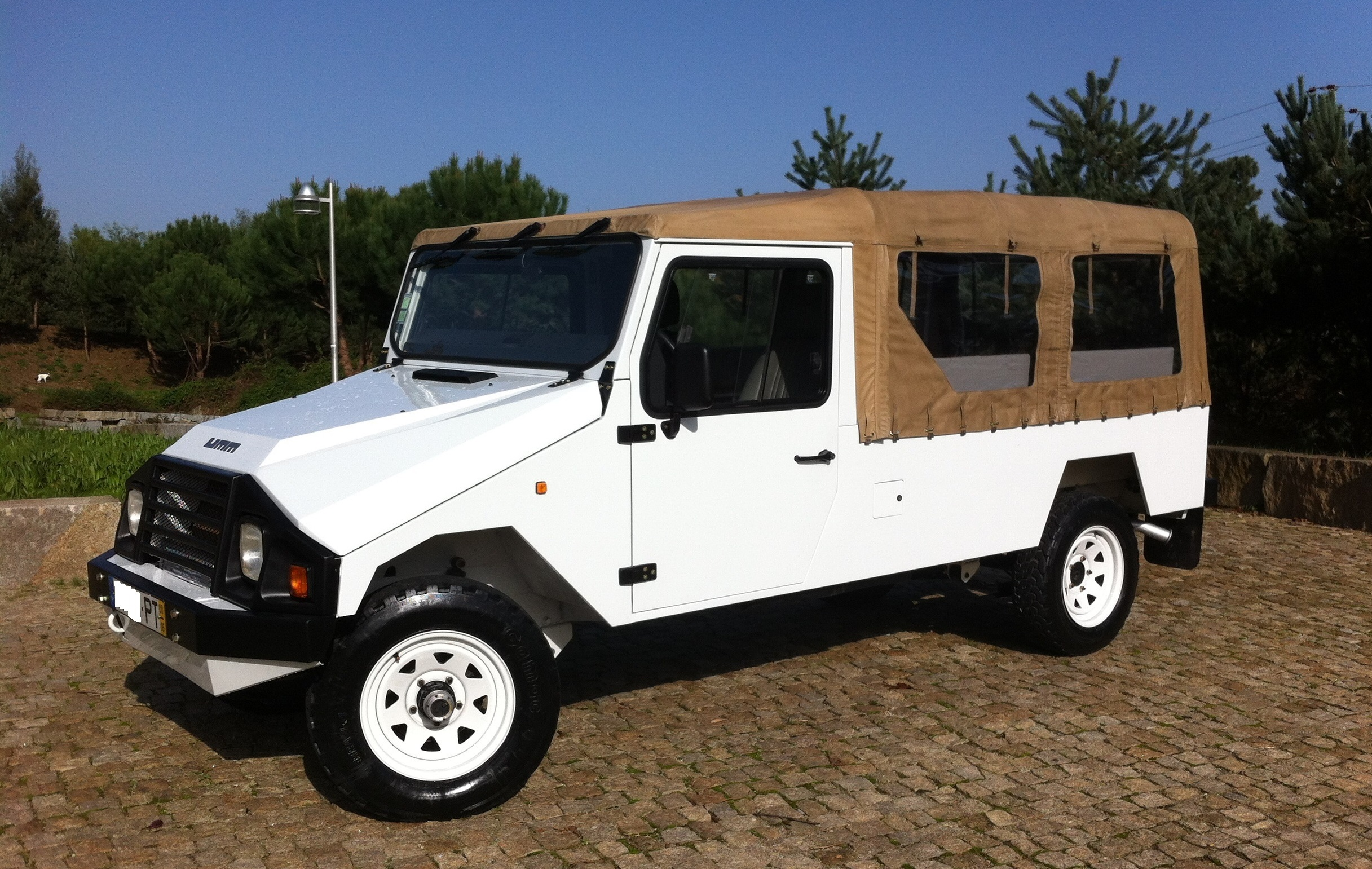
UMM Alter 2000 – Side view

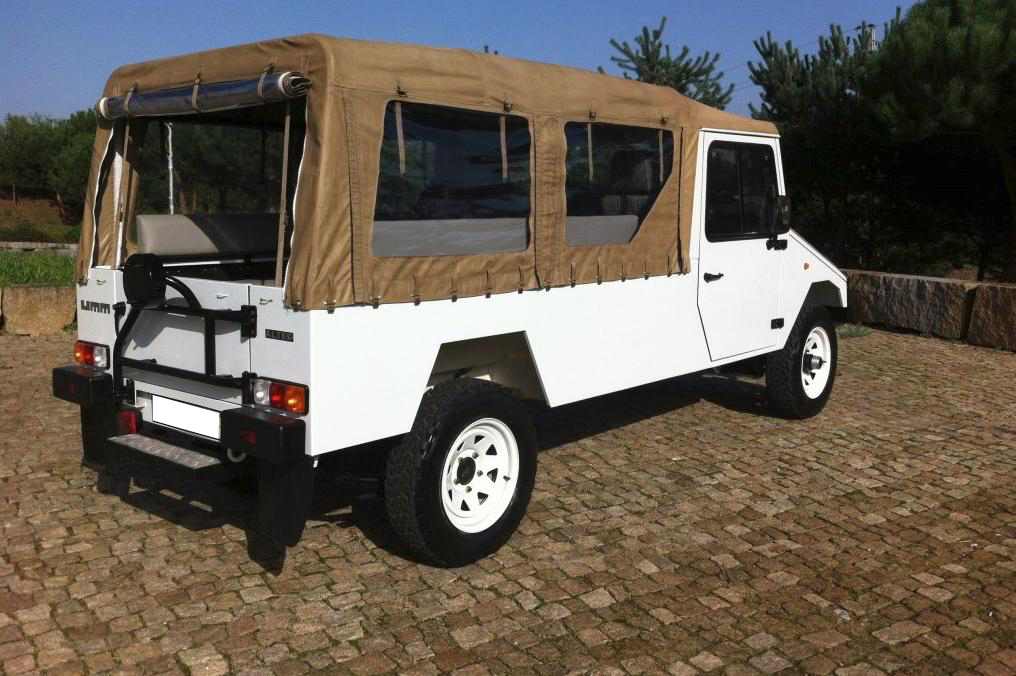
UMM Alter 2000 – Rear view

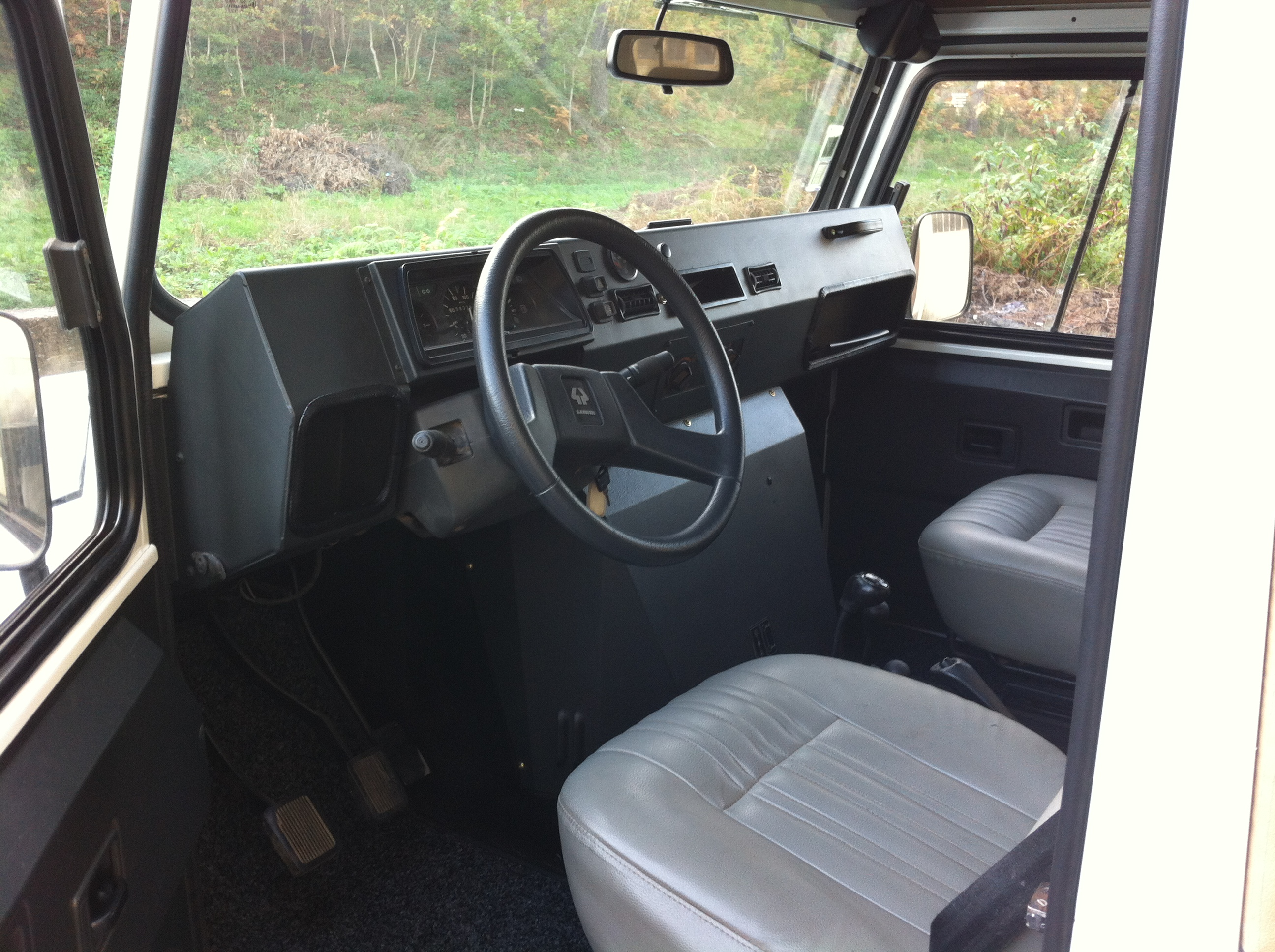
UMM Alter 2000 – Interior

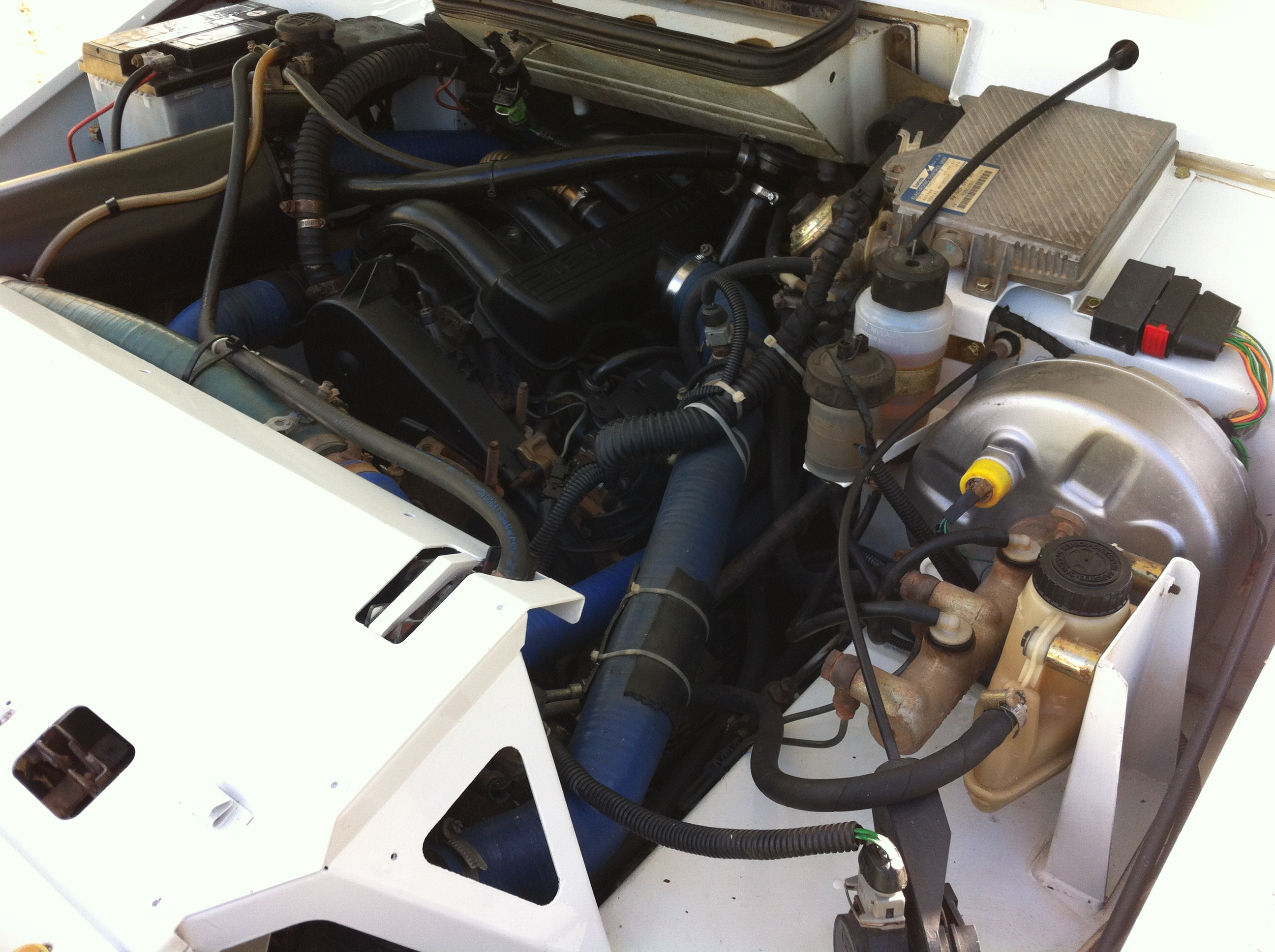
UMM Alter 2000 – Engine bay
