= Cournil =

French vehicle maker

Bernard Cournil
- Company type: Private company
- Industry: Automotive
- Headquarters: Aurillac, France; Saint-Germain-Laval, France
- Key people: Bernard Cournil; Alain Cournil
- Products: Four-wheel drive agricultural quasi-Jeeps

Bernard Cournil was a French vehicle maker who progressed from improving other people’s vehicles to manufacturing his own during the late 1950s. Rights to manufacture his design were subsequently held by a succession of businesses in Portugal after the French creator of the vehicle had disappeared from the picture. The vehicle built was also called the Cournil, and was intended mainly as an all-round offroad vehicle especially suited for farm usage: it could pull a plow and was offered with a PTO, cranes, or even machine gun mountings.

== The man ==
Bernard Cournil was born in Aurillac in April 1909. He was a passionate engineer and, as a young man, closely involved with the compagnonnage before returning to his native Cantal where he set up an automobile workshop business which as the next war progressed and the oil ran out, specialised in converting cars to run on wood based “gazogène” fuel.

== Improving the Jeep ==
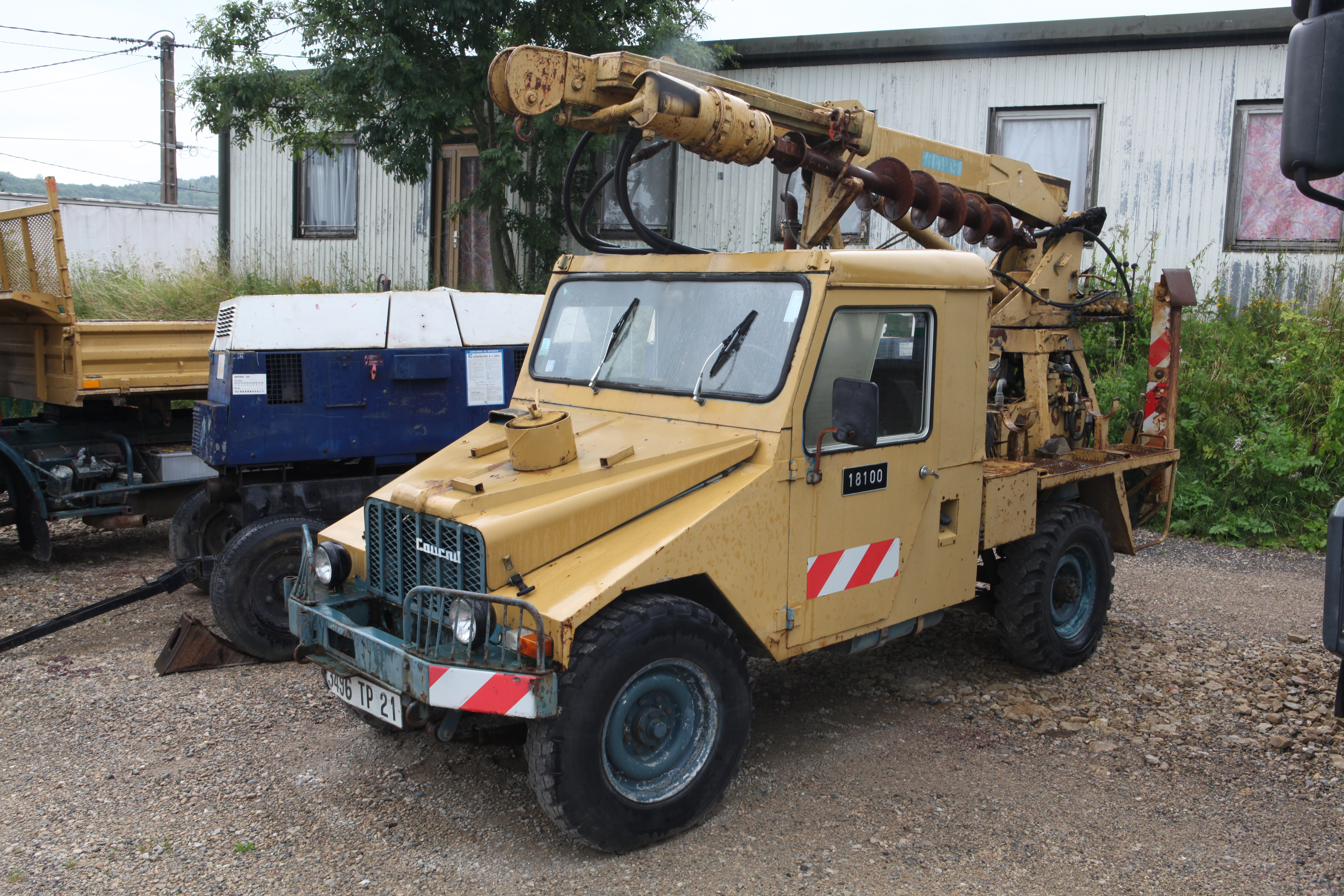
Cournil 4x4 fitted with an earth auger

After the war Cournil found a stock of US built Jeeps that had been left behind, and these he adapted and maintained for agricultural use. When Hotchkiss began to assemble Jeeps under license in France, it was a natural progression for Cournil to become a regional distributor for the Hotchkiss built Jeep, and in 1954 he went a stage further, concluding his own licensing agreement with Willys Jeep for assembling their vehicle.

Little by little Cournil now progressed from assembling Jeeps to improving them. Responding to a perceived concern over the robustness of the standard gear-box, Cournil substituted gearwheels derived from castings which he machined in his own workshops. He then started looking for an engine that would be more reliable than the ones provided from Hotchkiss, initially substituting a diesel unit from Ferguson. By the early 1960s he had decided that the Hotchkiss Jeep chassis was insufficiently robust for the agricultural challenges of central France, and had substituted his own virtually indestructible four-wheel drive vehicle which had progressed a long way beyond the original Jeep design and which in the Mining industry acquired the soubriquet “Tracteur Cournil”. The date when Cournil became a vehicle manufacturer in his own right was in 1960, when their own frame was introduced for the "Cournil Tracteur JA1". In 1961 Cournil changed the design of their truck, creating a distinct shape which was to last until 1986, and until 2004 in modified forms. The front was distinguished by drastically sloped fenders to allow for maximum visibility on the narrow mountain tracks for which the vehicle was intended.

Built mostly by hand his products gradually used more and more proprietary components, built by Cournil or especially for them. Production had still only reached a total of 850 units (most sold locally in the Massif Central region) by 1972. After filing bankruptcy in 1970 Bernard's son Alain took over, building 53 units between 1971 and 1977. This was a dark period for the small firm in spite of Bernard's close cooperation; Alain's operation was run out of a small garage rather than a factory and with credit hard to come by development came to a standstill. In 1977 the Cournils decided to sell the operation to two firms: the French rights went to arms company Gevarm, of the "Groupe Gévelot", while the rights to market areas outside of the domain of the French were sold to UMM of Portugal. This was also when the business was relocated from Aurillac to Saint-Germain-Laval. In 1980 the firm was taken over by SIMI of the Belin group, who built another 560 units until 1984, again mainly for government use. In 1984 Auverland took over, introducing a redesigned body for their "A3" in 1986.

=== Design ===
The first Cournil Tracteur (JA1) used leftover Standard 23C diesel engines from the Ferguson TE20/FF30, often known as "Hotchkiss engines" as they had been built under license in the Hotchkiss plant in Paris until 1958. This 2,088 cc (127.4 cu in) engine produces 30 PS (22 kW). As availability of the Hotchkiss-built engine came to an end, the 23C was replaced by a Leyland unit (the "O.E. 138") in 1964 - this was a derivative of the 23C engine, and still built by Standard after having been taken over by Leyland. Displacement was increased to 2,260 cc (137.9 cu in) engine and power up to 35 PS (26 kW); the design also benefitted from glow plugs and a stronger oil pump amongst other detail improvements. 1964 also marked the introduction of a differential lock. The new engine was considerably smoother and was also available in a version with higher output, 54 PS (40 kW), and the model was now called the JA2. In 1968 BLMC was formed, and as a result about fifty JA2s were equipped with the less-than-reliable 2.1-litre Land Rover diesel engine. A variety of other available engines followed, from Saviem, Renault, Indenor, and others.

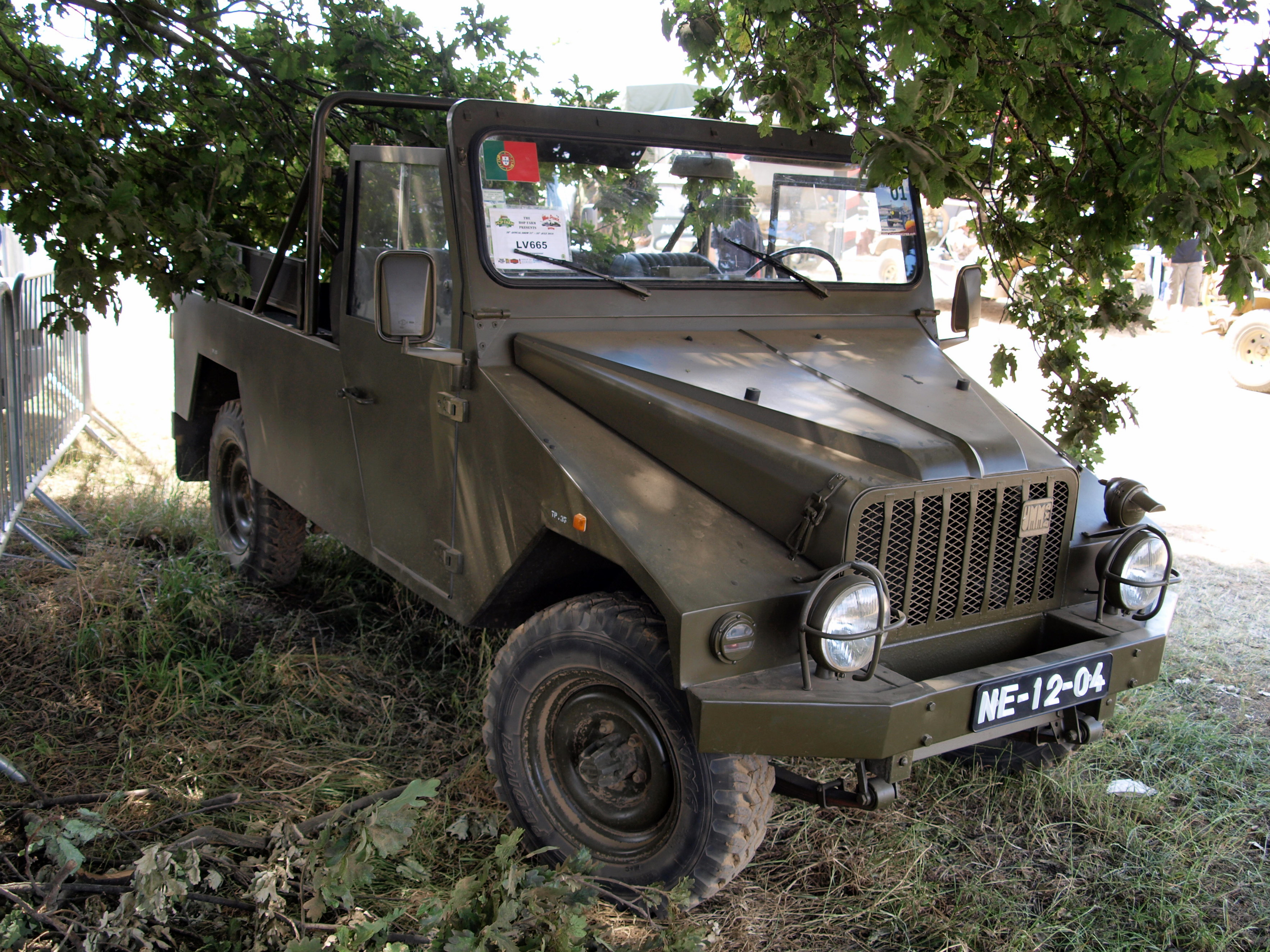
A 1983 UMM Entrepreneur, nearly identical to a Cournil of the period

The Gevarm-built Cournil, the first one that can be considered a true "production" model, came in two wheelbases: 2,040 or 2,540 mm (80 or 100 in). The engines offered were a 2.6-litre Saviem 817 petrol unit with 69 PS (51 kW) (SCE14/24), or a 2.1-litre Indenor diesel unit (XDP 4/90) with 62 PS (46 kW), called the SCD14/24. The larger Saviem 720 diesel of 3.6 litres was also available, with 85 PS (63 kW). This was originally only offered with the longer wheelbase and is called the SCD28. Top speeds for all three models were claimed to be 107.56 km/h (66.83 mph). The English importer also installed the 2.7-litre Perkins 4.165 diesel engine to suit local needs. Right-hand drive models were not offered until 1979. Later on the larger, 2.3-litre Indenor diesel engine replaced the 2.1 used earlier, creating the SCD15/25 models. There was also a version with a two-litre Renault 829 engine available from 1979 (SCE15/25). It was detuned from 109 to 83 PS (80 to 61 kW), compared to the Renault 20 TS in which it was normally installed.

=== SIMI era ===
SIMI began by taking over the existing Gevarm lineup, but soon began adding new engines. A redesign also followed, as did a modified chassis with new dimensions. The wheelbases offered were now 2,200 and 2,750 mm (86.6 and 108 in), while PSA's 2.5-litre XD3 P diesel and 2.3-litre XD2 PS turbodiesel engines were on offer alongside the 2- and 3.6-litre Renault/Saviem petrol units. During SIMI's ownership, the short wheelbase model began being referred to as the "Randonneur" while the LWB model was called the "Entrepreneur".

Auverland continued to build SIMI's lightly modified version as the SC (in SC-200, -250, and SC-11 versions), and the more heavily modified version as the A-2, until the A-3 was introduced in July 1987.

== A series of afterlives ==
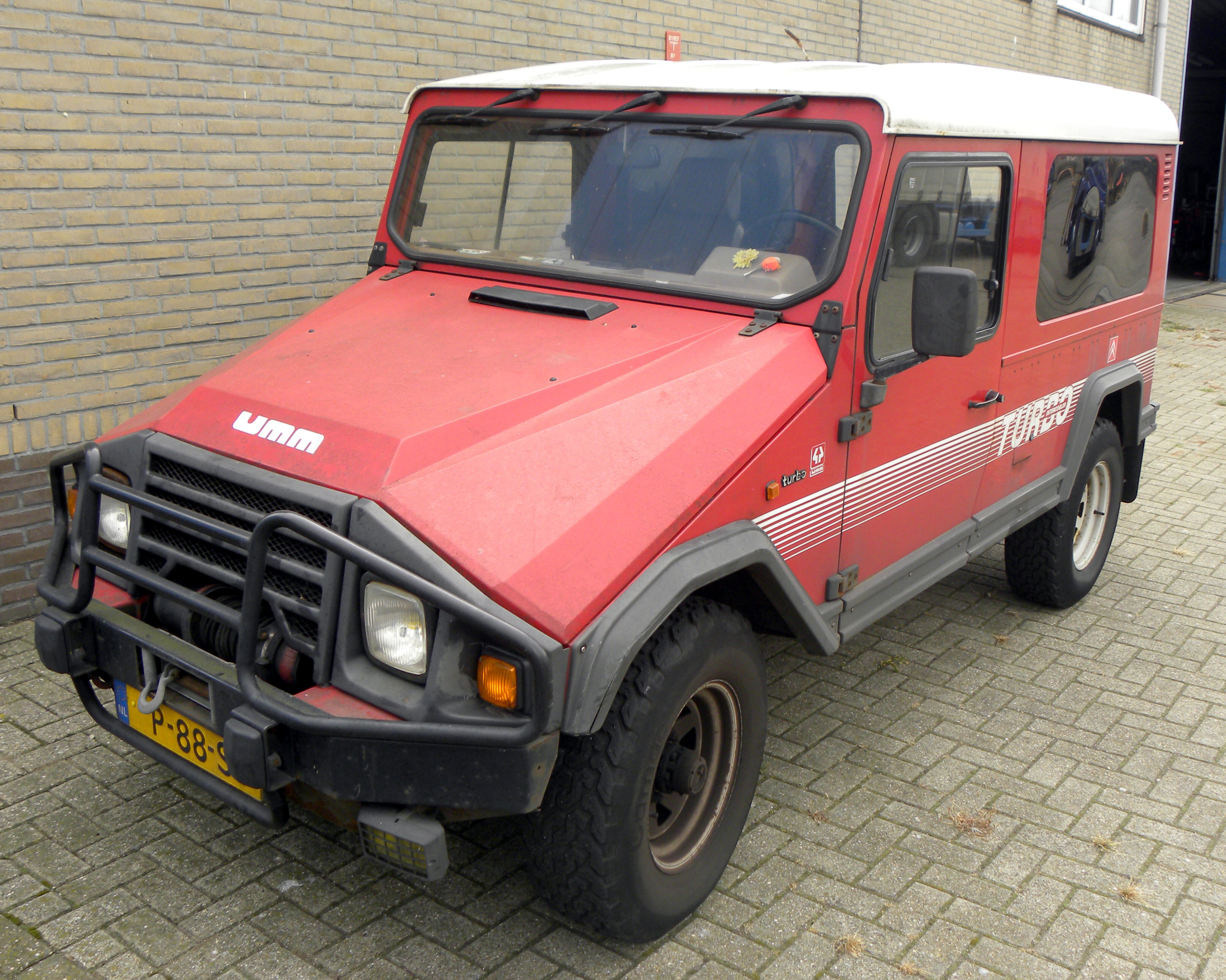
Cournil's design later turned up as a Portuguese UMM vehicle.

The Bernard Cournil company of Saint-Germain-Laval (Loire) progressed to vehicle manufacturing in about 1960. From 1979 the vehicles were also produced under licence in Portugal by UMM; the French market was off limits to the UMMs. The business was acquired by the Société I.M.I. company (SIMI) in 1980 and during a period when ownership was being transferred to Auverland in 1983/84 the vehicle was briefly marketed as the Autoland. In 1982 Auverland took over the business and after 1985 the vehicle was marketed as such. UMM kept improving the car and offered a number of different engines over the years, keeping it in production until 2004. The Auverland also provided the basis for Brazil's "JPX Montez", built from 1992 until 2002.
