= M274 ½-ton 4×4 utility platform truck =

American military truck

M274 Truck, Platform, Utility, 1/2 Ton, 4X4
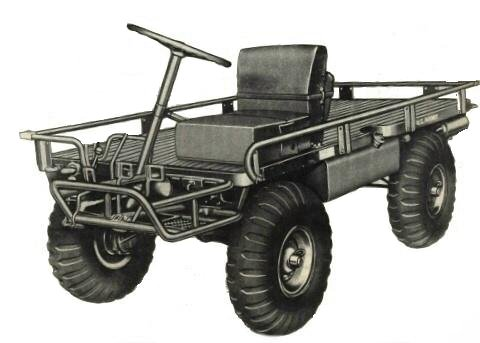
- M274 Mechanical Mule
- Type: 1/2 ton (454kg) 4x4 platform truck
- Place of origin: United States

Production history
- Designer: Willys
- Manufacturer: Willys, Bowen Mc Laughlin York, Baifield Industries, Brunswick
- Produced: 1956–1970
- Variants: M274 A1, A2, A3, A4, A5

Specifications
- Mass: 795 lb (361 kg)
- Length: 118 in (3.00 m)
- Width: 50 in (1.27 m)
- Height: 50 in (1.27 m)
- Engine: Willys AO4-4-53; 16 hp (12 kW)
- Transmission: 3 spd. x 2 range trf. case
- Suspension: Low pressure tires only
- Fuel capacity: 8 US gal (30 L)
- Operational range: 108 mi (173.8 km)
- Maximum speed: 25 mph (40 km/h)

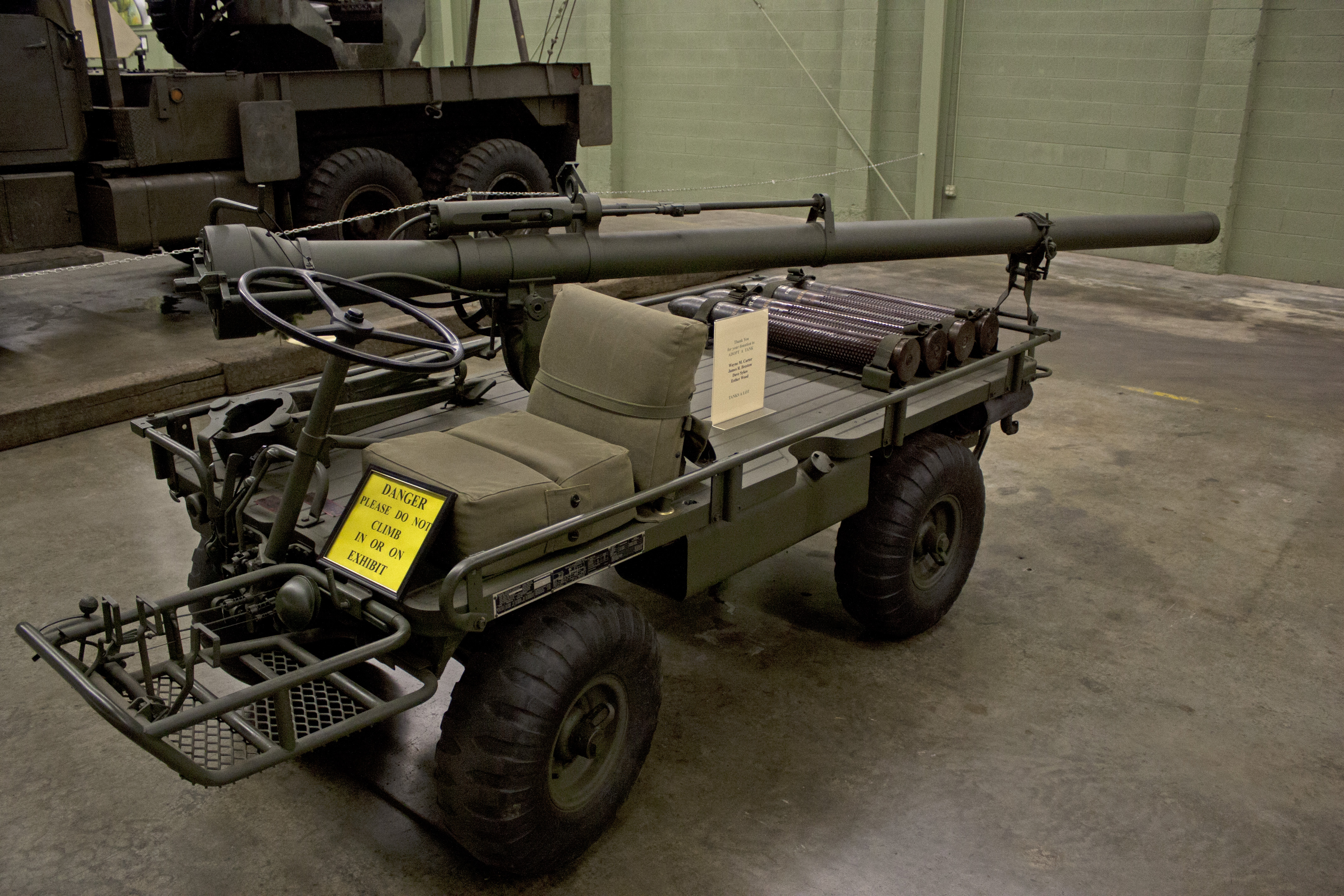
A M274 with a M40 recoilless rifle

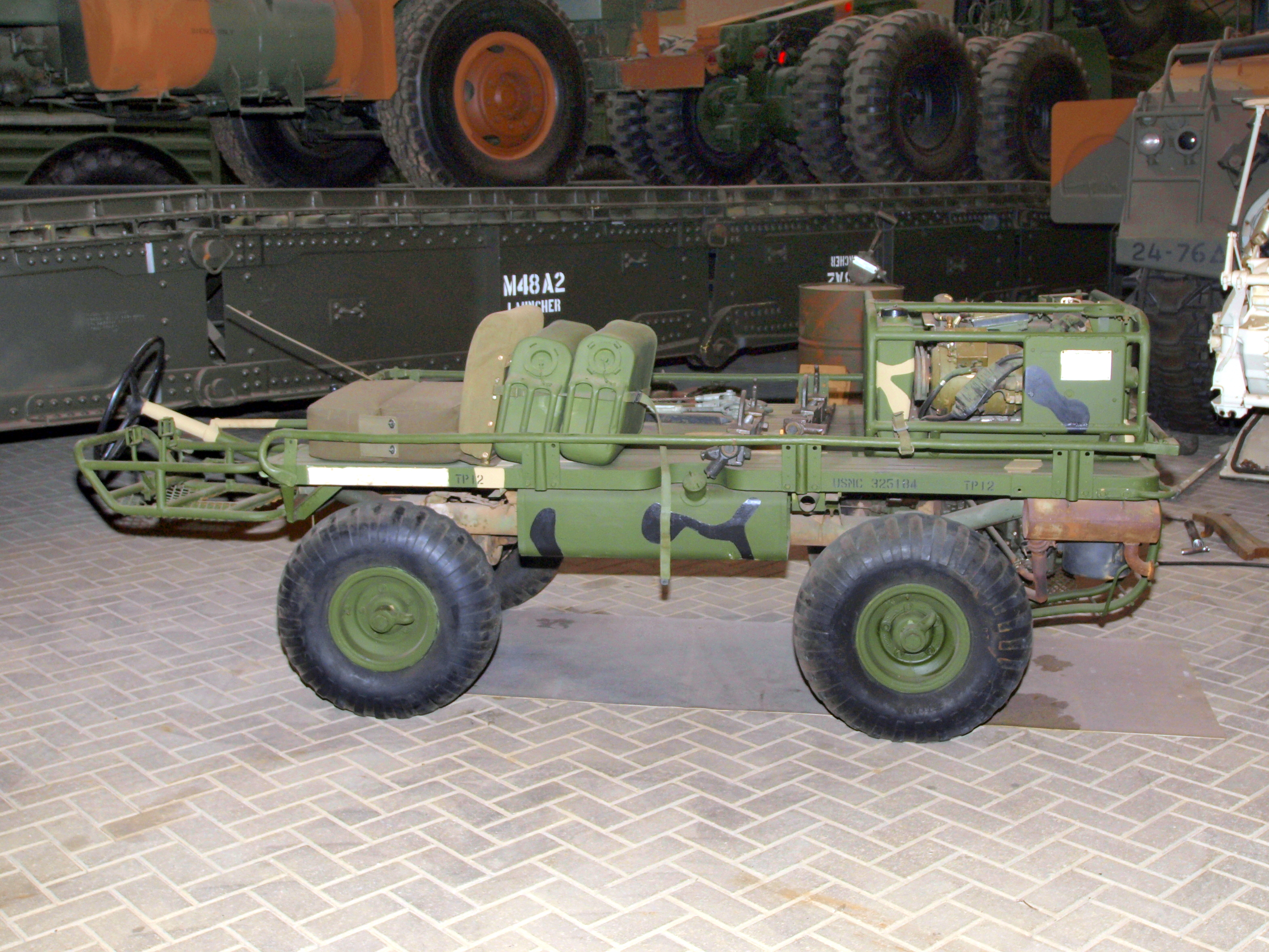
A loaded M274 with steering column lowered

Marines with a Mechanical Mule and 106 mm recoilless rifle, Operation Pipestone Canyon, 1969

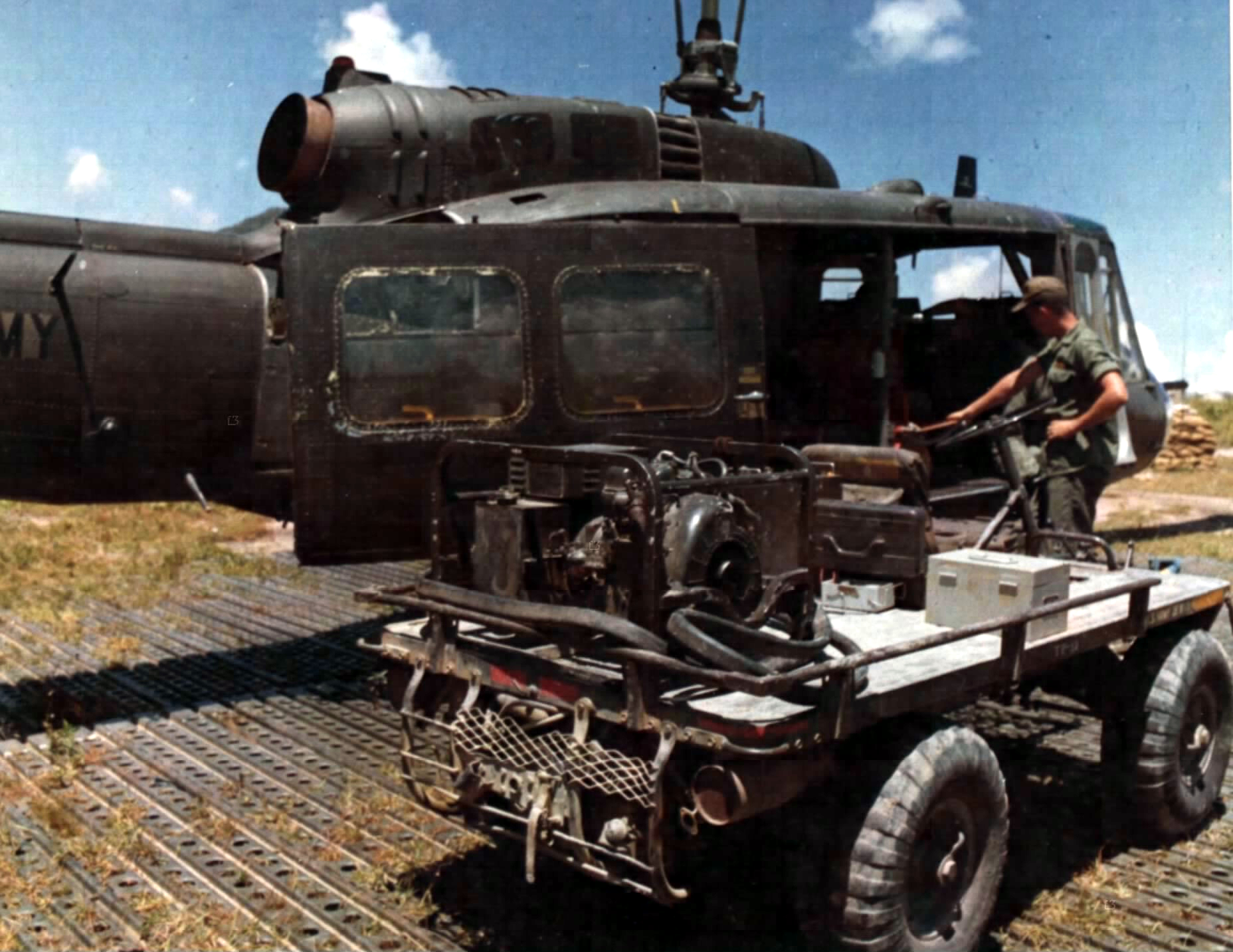
In service during the Vietnam War for maintenance of a Bell UH-1 helicopter at Camp Radcliff, 1966

The U.S. Military M274 Truck, Platform, Utility, 1/2 Ton, 4X4 or "Carrier, Light Weapons, Infantry, 1/2 ton, 4x4", also known as the "Mule", "Military Mule", or "Mechanical Mule", is a 4-wheel drive, gasoline-powered truck/tractor type vehicle that can carry up to 1/2 short ton (0.45 tonnes) off-road. It was introduced in 1956 and used until the 1980s.

== Background ==
The M274 Mule was introduced in 1956 to supplement both the 1/4-short-ton (0.23-tonne) trucks ("Jeeps") and 3/4-short-ton (0.68-tonne) trucks (Weapons Carrier Series and M37 series) in airborne and infantry battalions. The M274 evolved from improvements to a vehicle designed at the end of World War Two by Willys-Overland as a medical evacuation litter carrier from areas and terrain that would be a problem for the standard light vehicle of the period, the Jeep, to access.

U.S. Patent 2457400 for the original design was applied for on December 2, 1944 and issued on December 28, 1948. No patent appears to have been issued for the later production model. Further tests by the US Army at Eglin Field, Florida proved it also useful as carrier for both supplies and men. In 1948 the US Army purchased a small number of these test vehicles with the designation the 'Jungle Burden Carrier' for evaluation in jungle warfare and with airborne forces.

There were 11,240 Mules produced between their introduction and 1970, when production ceased. They were used throughout as platforms for weapons systems and for carrying men, supplies, and weaponry/ammunition during the Vietnam War and in other U.S. military operations until the 1980s. As a completely open and exposed vehicle, they offered absolutely no protection to the driver, yet that was relatively unimportant as they were mainly used as cargo carriers and medium-range infantry support vehicles, rather than tactical vehicles.

The driver's seat could be removed and the steering column moved forward and the vehicle driven in reverse to accommodate more cargo. If under fire, the steering column could be moved further forward and down, so the operator could operate the vehicle while crawling behind it. They were phased out from military usage in the 1980s with the introduction of the HMMWV series vehicles. The HMMWV was unable to fulfill the role of the Mule, so the M-Gator, a military variant of the popular John Deere Gator vehicle, was introduced.

== Armament ==
The M274 Mules were often outfitted with a wide array of weaponry, especially in the Vietnam War. They could be modified to carry virtually any type of conventional weapon that could be mounted on a truck. Most commonly, the M274 was outfitted with:

- M60 7.62mm NATO machine guns
- M2HB .50 caliber machine guns
- M40 106 mm recoilless rifles
- TOW anti-tank missile systems

== Powerplant, drivetrain, and speeds ==
The M274 Mules were all powered by internal-combustion gasoline engines. M274s and M274A1s were powered by a four-cylinder Willys four-stroke engine. The M274A2 through A5 had a two-cylinder Continental-Hercules four-stroke air-cooled engine. All Mules had three-speed manual non-synchromesh transmissions with two-speed transfer cases and four-wheel drive. Except for the A5, all Mules had four-wheel steering. No model of the Mule was equipped with a dedicated suspension system, relying only on their low-pressure tires and seat cushions to maintain ride comfort.

The lower speeds and high power (14 hp or 10 kW) of the Mule made it a versatile off-road vehicle. It could climb over logs, go up steep slopes, and cross rivers in first gear.

Low range First – 1 mph (1.6 km/h) Second – 4 mph (6.4 km/h) Third – 9 mph (14 km/h)

High range First – 7 mph (11 km/h) Second – 18 mph (29 km/h) Third – 25 mph (40 km/h)

== See also ==
- Fabrique Nationale AS 24
- G-numbers
