= Lists of currently active military equipment by country =

The following is a list of lists of currently active military equipment by country.

== Afghanistan ==
- List of equipment of the Afghan Armed Force
- Aircraft of the Afghan Air Force

== Albania ==
- Equipment of the Albanian Armed Forces

== Algeria ==
- Equipment of the Algerian Land Forces
- Aircraft of the Algerian Air Force

== Angola ==
- Equipment of the Angolan Army
- Aircraft of the National Air Force of Angola

== Argentina ==
- Equipment of the Argentine Army
- Aircraft of the Argentina Armed Forces
- Ships of the Argentine Navy

== Armenia ==
- Equipment of the Armenian Armed Forces

== Australia ==
- Equipment of the Australian Army
- Aircraft of the Royal Australian Air Force
- Ships of the Royal Australian Navy

== Austria ==
- Equipment of the Austrian Army
- Aircraft of the Austrian Air Force

== Azerbaijan ==
- Equipment of the Azerbaijani Land Forces
- Equipment of the Azerbaijani Air Force
- Equipment of the Azerbaijani Navy

== Bahrain ==
- List of equipment of the Royal Bahraini Army
- List of equipment of the Royal Bahrain Naval Force
- List of aircraft of the Royal Bahraini Air Force

== Bangladesh ==
- Currently active ships of the Bangladesh Navy
- List of ships of the Bangladesh Coast Guard
- Active Bangladesh military aircraft
- Equipment of the Bangladesh Army

== Belarus ==
- List of equipment of the Armed Forces of Belarus
- List of aircraft of the Belarusian Air Force

== Belgium ==
- List of equipment of the Belgian Land Component
- List of equipment of the Belgian Navy
- List of aircraft of the Belgian Air Component

== Belize ==
- List of equipment of the Belize Defence Force
- List of equipment of the Belize Coast Guard

== Benin ==
- List of equipment of the Benin Armed Forces

== Bhutan ==
- List of equipment used by the Royal Bhutan Army

== Bolivia ==
- List of equipment of the Bolivian Armed Forces
- List of aircraft of the Bolivian Air Force

== Bosnia and Herzegovina ==
- List of equipment of the Armed Forces of Bosnia and Herzegovina
- List of aircraft of the Air Force of Bosnia and Herzegovina

== Botswana ==
- List of equipment of the Botswana Ground Force
- List of aircraft of the Botswana Defence Force Air Wing

== Brazil ==
- List of ships of the Brazilian Navy
- List of modern equipment of the Brazilian Army
- List of equipment of the Brazilian Marine Corps
- List of active Brazilian military aircraft

== Brunei ==
- List of equipment of the Royal Brunei Land Forces
- List of equipment of the Royal Brunei Air Force
- List of Royal Brunei Navy ships

== Bulgaria ==
- Modern equipment of the Bulgarian land forces
- List of aircraft of the Bulgarian Air Force
- List of equipment of the Bulgarian Navy

== Burkina Faso ==
- List of equipment of the Burkina Faso Armed Forces
- List of aircraft of the Burkina Faso Air Force

== Burundi ==
- List of equipment of the Burundi National Defence Force

== Cape Verde ==
- List of equipment of the Cape Verdean Armed Forces

== Cambodia ==
- List of equipment of the Royal Cambodian Army

== Cameroon ==
- List of equipment of the Cameroon Army
- List of aircraft of the Cameroon Air Force
- List of equipment of the Cameroon Navy

== Canada ==
- Fleet of the Royal Canadian Navy
- List of aircraft of the Royal Canadian Air Force
- List of active Canadian military aircraft
- List of modern Canadian Army equipment

== Central African Republic ==
- List of equipment of the Central African Army
- List of aircraft of the Central African Republic Air Force

== Chad ==
- List of equipment of the Chadian Ground Forces
- List of aircraft of the Chadian Air Force

== Chile ==
- List of current equipment of the Chilean Air Force
- List of current equipment of the Chilean Army
- List of current equipment of the Chilean Navy
- List of active ships of the Chilean Navy
- List of active Chile military aircraft

== China ==
- List of ships of the PLA Navy
- List of Aircraft of the PLA Air Force
- List of Equipment of the PLA Ground Force
- List of Equipment of the PLA Rocket Force

== Côte d'Ivoire ==
- List of equipment of the armed forces of the Republic of Ivory Coast

== Colombia ==
- List of equipment of the National Army of Colombia
- List of aircraft of the Colombian Air Force
- List of active ships of the Colombian Navy

== Comoros ==
- List of equipment of the Comorian Army

== Croatia ==
- List of equipment of the Croatian Army

== Cuba ==
- List of equipment of the Cuban Revolutionary Armed Forces

== Cyprus ==
- List of military equipment of Cyprus

== Czechia ==
- Military equipment of the Czech Republic
- List of military aircraft of the Czech Republic

== DR Congo ==
- List of equipment of the Democratic Republic of the Congo Army
- Air Force equipment of the Democratic Republic of the Congo

== Denmark ==
- List of equipment of the Royal Danish Army
- List of active Royal Danish Navy ships
- List of active Royal Danish Air Force aircraft

== Djibouti ==
- List of equipment of the Djiboutian Army
- List of aircraft of the Djiboutian Air Force
- List of equipment of the Djiboutian Navy

== Dominican Republic ==
- List of equipment of the Dominican Army
- List of current vessels of the Dominican Navy
- List of current aircraft of the Dominican Air Force

== Egypt ==
- Equipment of the Egyptian Army
- List of ships of the Egyptian Navy
- List of aircraft of the Egyptian Air Force

== El Salvador ==
- List of equipment of the Salvadoran Army
- List of aircraft of the Salvadoran Air Force
- List of ships of the Salvadoran Navy

== Eritrea ==
- List of equipment of the Eritrean Army
- List of aircraft of the Eritrean Air Force
- List of ships of the Eritrean Navy

== Ecuador ==
- List of equipment of the Ecuadorian Army
- List of aircraft of the Ecuadorian Air Force
- List of ships of the Ecuadorian Navy

== Estonia ==
- List of equipment of the Estonian Defence Forces

== Ethiopia ==
- List of equipment of the Ethiopian Army
- List of aircraft of the Ethiopian Air Force

== Finland ==
- List of equipment of the Finnish Army
- List of equipment of the Finnish Navy
- List of active Finnish Navy ships
- List of military aircraft of Finland

== France ==
- Active French Navy ships
- Modern equipment and uniform of the French Army
- List of active military aircraft of the French Armed Forces

== Georgia ==
- List of equipment of the Defense Forces of Georgia

== Germany ==
- German Army:
  - List of modern equipment of the German Army
- German Air Force:
  - List of active equipment of the German Air Force
- German Navy:
  - List of active German Navy ships
  - List of active aircraft of the German Navy
  - List of active weapons of the German Navy
- Active German Navy ships
- List of aircraft of the German Air Force

== Ghana ==
- List of equipment of the Ghana Army

== Greece ==
- List of equipment of the Hellenic Army
- List of active Hellenic Navy ships
- List of aircraft of the Hellenic Air Force

== Hungary ==
- List of equipment of the Hungarian Ground Forces

== Iceland ==
- List of aircraft of the Icelandic Coast Guard

== India ==
- Active Indian Navy ships
- Equipment of the Indian Army
- Active Indian military aircraft
- Active Indian Coast Guard equipment
- Guided missiles of India
- Weapon systems of the Indian Navy

== Indonesia ==
- Equipment of the Indonesian Navy
- Equipment of the Indonesian Army
- Equipment of the Indonesian Air Force
- List of active Indonesian Navy ships
- List of aircraft of the Indonesian National Armed Forces

== Iran ==
- List of active Iranian Navy ships
- List of active Iranian military Aircraft
- Equipment of Iranian army
- List of equipment of the Islamic Revolutionary Guard Corps Navy

== Ireland ==
- List of equipment of the Irish Army
- List of aircraft of the Irish Air Corps
- List of equipment of the Irish Naval Service

== Iraq ==
- List of current equipment of the Iraqi Ground Forces

== Israel ==
- List of equipment of the Israel Defense Forces
- List of aircraft of the Israeli Air Force
- List of ships of the Israeli Navy

== Italy ==
- Equipment of the Italian Army
- List of active Italian military aircraft
- List of active Italian Navy ships
- List of aircraft used by Italian Air Force

== Japan ==
- Active Japan Maritime Self-Defense Force ships
- List of modern equipment of the Japan Ground Self-Defense Force
- List of military aircraft of Japan
- List of Japan Coast Guard vessels and aircraft

== Jordan ==
- List of equipment of the Royal Jordanian Army

== Kazakhstan ==
- List of equipment of the Armed Forces of the Republic of Kazakhstan

== Kosovo ==
- List of equipment of the Kosovo Security Force

== Latvia ==
- Equipment of the Latvian Land Forces
- Equipment of the Latvian Air Force

== Lithuania ==
- List of equipment of the Lithuanian Armed Forces
- List of aircraft of the Lithuanian Air Force
- List of vessels of the Lithuanian Navy

== Luxembourg ==
- List of equipment of the Luxembourg Army
- List of aircraft of the Luxembourg Air Wing

== Malaysia ==
- Equipment of the Malaysian Army
- Equipment of the Royal Malaysian Air Force
- Equipment of the Royal Malaysian Navy
- List of aircraft of the Malaysian Armed Forces

== Malta ==
- Equipment of the Armed Forces of Malta
- Active aircraft of Malta's Air Wing
- Active vessels of Malta's Maritime Squadron

== Morocco ==
- List of active Moroccan military aircraft
- List of equipment of the Royal Moroccan Army
- List of vessels of the Royal Moroccan Navy

== Myanmar ==
- List of equipment of the Myanmar Army
- List of equipment in the Myanmar Navy
- List of equipment of the Myanmar Air Force

== Netherlands ==
- Royal Netherlands Army
  - Equipment of the Royal Netherlands Army
- Royal Netherlands Air and Space Force
  - Equipment of the Royal Netherlands Air Force
- Royal Netherlands Navy
  - List of active Royal Netherlands Navy ships
  - List of other equipment of the Royal Netherlands Navy
  - List of equipment of the Royal Netherlands Marine Corps

== New Zealand ==
- List of active New Zealand military aircraft
- List of active Royal New Zealand Navy ships
- List of equipment of the New Zealand Army
- List of individual weapons of the New Zealand armed forces

== Nigeria ==
- List of equipment of the Nigerian Army

== North Korea ==
- List of equipment of the Korean People's Army Ground Force
- List of active ships of the Korean People's Navy

== Norway ==
- List of equipment of the Norwegian Army
- List of active Royal Norwegian Navy ships

== Palestine ==
- Palestinian National Security Forces
- Palestinian domestic weapons production
- Palestinian rocket arsenal

== Pakistan ==
- List of active Pakistan Navy ships
- List of aircraft of the Pakistan Naval Air Arm
- List of equipment of the Pakistan Navy
- Equipment of Pakistan Maritime Security Agency
- List of equipment of the Pakistan Army
- List of missiles of Pakistan
- List of active Pakistan Air Force aircraft
- List of equipment of the Pakistan Air Force

== Philippines ==
- Equipment of the Philippine Army
- Equipment of the Philippine Air Force
  - Active military aircraft of the Philippines
- Equipment of the Philippine Navy
- Equipment of the Philippine Marine Corps

== Poland ==
- Equipment of the Polish Army
- List of ships of the Polish Navy
- Polish Air Force

== Portugal ==
- Equipment of the Portuguese Army
- Active Portuguese Navy ships
- List of aircraft of the Portuguese Air Force

== Qatar ==
- List of equipment of the Qatar Armed Forces
- Ship and equipment of Qatari Emiri Navy
- Qatar Emiri Air Force

== Romania ==
- Equipment of the Romanian Armed Forces
- List of aircraft of the Romanian Air Force

== Russia ==
- List of active Russian Navy ships
- List of active Russian Air Force aircraft
- List of active Russian military aircraft
- List of equipment of the Russian Ground Forces

== Saudi Arabia ==
- List of equipment of the Saudi Arabian Army
- List of aircraft of the Royal Saudi Air Force
- List of ships of the Royal Saudi Navy

== Serbia ==
- List of equipment of the Serbian Armed Forces
- List of aircraft of the Serbian Air Force
- List of equipment of the Serbian River Flotilla

== Singapore ==
- List of equipment of the Singapore Army
- Republic of Singapore Air Force Equipment
- List of equipment of the Republic of Singapore Navy

== Slovakia ==
- List of equipment of the Slovak Ground Forces

== Slovenia ==
- Slovenian Ground Force Equipment

== Somalia ==
- List of equipment of the Somali Armed Forces

== South Africa ==
- List of equipment of the South African Army
- List of aircraft of the South African Air Force
- List of weapon systems of the South African Air Force
- List of active South African Navy ships

== South Korea ==
- List of active Republic of Korea Navy ships
- List of equipment of the Republic of Korea Army

== South Sudan ==
- List of equipment of the South Sudan People's Defence Forces
- South Sudan Air Force Inventory

== Spain ==
- List of active Spanish Navy ships
- List of equipment of the Spanish Army
- List of currently active Spain military land vehicles
- List of active Spanish military aircraft

== Sri Lanka ==
- Sri Lanka Army Equipment
- List of current Sri Lanka Navy ships
- Sri Lanka Air Force Inventory

== Sudan ==
- List of equipment of the Sudanese Armed Forces
- Sudanese Air Force Inventory
- List of Sudanese Navy ships

== Sweden ==
- List of equipment of the Swedish Armed Forces
  - Swedish Army:
    - List of equipment of the Swedish Army
  - Swedish Air Force:
    - Current fleet of the Swedish Air Force
    - List of equipment of the Swedish Air Force
    - Weapons of the Swedish Air Force
    - List of military aircraft of Sweden
  - Swedish Navy:
    - List of active ships of the Swedish Navy
    - List of equipment of the Swedish Navy
  - Swedish Home Guard:
    - List of equipment of the Swedish Home Guard
  - Swedish Coast Guard:
    - Swedish Coast Guard ships
    - Swedish Coast Guard aviation

== Switzerland ==
- Swiss Army:
  - List of equipment of the Swiss Armed Forces
- Swiss Air Force
  - List of aircraft of the Swiss Air Force
  - Equipment of the Swiss Air Force

== Syria ==
- Equipment of the Syrian Army
- Syrian Air Force

== Taiwan ==
- List of equipment of the Republic of China Army
- List of equipment of the Republic of China Air Force
- List of Republic of China Navy ships

== Thailand ==
- List of equipment of the Royal Thai Army
- Equipment of the Royal Thai Navy
- Aircraft of the Royal Thai Air Force

== Turkey ==
- Military equipment of Turkey

== Turkmenistan ==
- List of equipment of the Turkmen Ground Forces
- Turkmen Naval Forces
- Turkmen Air Force

== Ukraine ==
- Active Ukrainian Navy ships
- Equipment of the Ukrainian Ground Forces
- List of equipment of the National Guard of Ukraine

== United Kingdom ==
- Active Royal Navy ships
- List of active Royal Marines military watercraft
- List of equipment of the Royal Marines
- Royal Fleet Auxiliary
- Active United Kingdom military aircraft
- Modern equipment of the British Army
- Active Royal Navy weapon systems

== United States ==
- Equipment of the United States Armed Forces
  - currently active United States military missiles
  - List of currently active United States military land vehicles
  - List of individual weapons of the U.S. Armed Forces
  - Uniforms of the United States Armed Forces
- Equipment of the United States Army
- Equipment of the United States Marine Corps
- Equipment of the United States Navy
  - currently active ships of the United States Navy
  - currently active United States military watercraft
- Equipment of the United States Air Force
  - currently active United States military aircraft
- Equipment of the United States Coast Guard

== Uruguay ==
- List of equipment of the Uruguayan Army

== Uzbekistan ==
- List of equipment of the Armed Forces of the Republic of Uzbekistan
- Uzbekistan Air and Air Defence Forces

== Vietnam ==
- List of equipment of the Vietnam People's Ground Forces
- List of equipment of the Vietnam People's Air Force
- List of equipment of the Vietnam People's Navy

== Venezuela ==
- List of equipment of the Venezuelan Army
- Bolivarian Military Aviation

== See also ==
- List of militaries by country
