= List of equipment of the Burkina Faso Armed Forces =

This is a list of equipment used by the Burkina Faso Armed Forces.

== Small arms ==
Name	Image	Caliber	Type	Origin	Notes
Pistols
Walther PP		.32 ACP	Semi-automatic pistol	Weimar Republic West Germany	
MAB PA-15		9×19mm	Semi-automatic pistol	France	
Manurhin MR 73		.38 Special	Revolver	France	
Submachine guns
MAS-38		7.65×20mm	Submachine gun	French Third Republic	
MAT-49		9×19mm	Submachine gun	French Fourth Republic	
Beretta M12		9×19mm	Submachine gun	Italy	
Rifles
Zastava M70		7.62×39mm	Assault rifle	Socialist Federal Republic of Yugoslavia	Used by peacekeeping forces.
Beretta AR70		5.56×45mm	Assault rifle	Italy	
SIG SG 540		5.56×45mm	Assault rifle	Switzerland	
Heckler & Koch G3		7.62×51mm	Battle rifle	West Germany	
MAS-49/56		7.5×54mm	Semi-automatic rifle	French Fourth Republic	
Machine guns
Zastava M84		7.62×54mmR	General-purpose machine gun	Socialist Federal Republic of Yugoslavia	Used by peacekeeping forces.
FN MAG		7.62×51mm	General-purpose machine gun	Belgium	
AA-52		7.5×54mm	General-purpose machine gun	French Fourth Republic	
Browning M2		.50 BMG	Heavy machine gun	United States	
DShKM		12.7×108mm	Heavy machine gun	Soviet Union	Used by peacekeeping forces.

== Anti-tank weapons ==
Name	Image	Caliber	Type	Origin	Notes
RPG-7		40mm	Rocket-propelled grenade	Soviet Union	Used by peacekeeping forces.
Type 52		75mm	Recoilless rifle	United States; China	
Carl Gustaf		84mm	Shoulder-fired recoilless rifle	Sweden	

== Anti-aircraft weapons ==
Name	Image	Type	Origin	Quantity	Notes
ZPU-2		Anti-aircraft gun	Soviet Union	30	Used by peacekeeping forces.
TCM-20		Anti-aircraft gun	United States	12	
9K32 Strela-2		Man-portable air-defense system	Soviet Union		

== Artillery ==
Name	Image	Type	Origin	Quantity	Notes
Rocket artillery
Type 63		Multiple rocket launcher	China	4	
APR-40		Multiple rocket launcher	Socialist Republic of Romania	5	
Field artillery
M101		Howitzer	United States	8	
Mortars
Brandt Mle 1935		Infantry mortar	French Third Republic		
Brandt Mle 27/31		Infantry mortar	French Third Republic		
PM-43		Towed mortar	Soviet Union	12	
81mm CS/SM1		Self-propelled mortar	China	6	Eight Norinco 81mm CS/SM1 self-propelled mortars mounted on a Dongfeng 4x4 light tactical vehicle were showcased in January 2024.

== Armoured fighting vehicles ==
Name	Image	Type	Origin	Quantity	Notes
Panhard AML		Armoured car	France	19	AML-60 and AML-90 models in service.
EE-9 Cascavel		Armoured car	Brazil	24	
Ferret		Scout car	United Kingdom	30	
M20		Scout car	United States	2	
M8 Greyhound		Armoured car	United States	8	
Nanga		Armoured personnel carrier	Burkina Faso	Unkown quantity in the army but, 300 are now operational	
Panhard M3		Armoured personnel carrier	France	13	
ACMAT Bastion		Armoured personnel carrier	France	11	
Nurol Ejder		Armoured personnel carrier	Turkey	4	
Stark Motors Storm		Infantry mobility vehicle	Qatar	21	
Ejder Yalçın		Infantry mobility vehicle	Turkey	24	
Isotrex Phantom II		Infantry mobility vehicle	United Arab Emirates	13+	
ACMAT Bastion Patsas		Infantry mobility vehicle	France	8+	
Otokar Cobra		Infantry mobility vehicle	Turkey	38	
Gila		MRAP	South Africa	6	
PUMA M26-15		MRAP	South Africa; Mozambique	63	
Temsah 2		MRAP	Egypt; Arab Organization for Industrialization	2	
CS/VP14		MRAP	China	100	
VP11		MRAP	China	40	
WMA301		Fire support vehicle	China	6	SIPRI's Arms Transfer Database indicates that six may have been ordered in 2023. They were showcased in January 2024.

== Utility vehicles ==
Name	Image	Type	Origin	Quantity	Notes
Auverland/SAMO		Utility	France		
ACMAT ALTV		Utility	France	10+	
Toyota Land Cruiser		Utility	Japan		Used by peacekeeping forces.
Pegaso 3045		Medium truck (3 tonnes)	Francoist Spain		
Ural-4320		Medium truck (4.5 tonnes)	Russia		Used by peacekeeping forces.

== Engineering and maintenance vehicles ==
Name	Image	Type	Origin	Quantity	Notes
KrAZ Shrek-M		Mine clearing vehicle	Ukraine	3	

== Bibliography ==
- Foss, Christopher F.; Gander, Terry J., eds. (1999). Jane's Military Vehicles and Logistics, 1999-2000 (20th ed.). Jane's Information Group. ISBN 978-0-7106-1912-9.
- International Institute for Strategic Studies (2024). "Chapter Eight: Sub-Saharan Africa". The Military Balance. 124 (1). Taylor & Francis: 458–531. doi:10.1080/04597222.2024.2298597. ISSN 0459-7222.
- Jones, Richard D.; Ness, Leland, eds. (2010). Jane's Infantry Weapons 2010-2011 (36th ed.). Janes Information Group. ISBN 978-0-7106-2908-1.
