= List of weapon systems of the South African Air Force =

The following is a list of current weapon systems (as of 2012) of the South African Air Force. For weapon system no longer in use, see List of obsolete weapon systems of the South African Air Force.

== Current systems ==
Weapon systems of the South African Air Force
Type	Manufacturer	Model	Platform
Air to air missile	Diehl BGT Defence	IRIS-T	Gripen C, Gripen D
Air to air missile	Denel Dynamics	A-Darter	Gripen C, Gripen D, Hawk 120 (Hawk integration in progress, not yet operational)
Air to surface missile	Denel Dynamics	Mokopa	Rooivalk, Super Lynx 300 (Integrated but not yet operational)
Reconnaissance / targeting pod	Northrop Grumman	Litening III targeting pod	Gripen C, Gripen D
Reconnaissance / targeting pod	Thales Optronics	Vicon 18-601E	Hawk Mk 120
Reconnaissance / targeting pod	Thales Optronics	Digital Joint Reconnaissance Pod	Gripen C, Gripen D
Reconnaissance / targeting pod	Carl Zeiss Optronics	Argos 410-Z	C208 Caravan, A109 LUH
Rocket launcher		Type 159 Launcher	Rooivalk
Rocket	Forges de Zeebrugge	FZ90 70mm FFAR	Rooivalk
Guided bomb	Raytheon	GBU-12 Paveway II	Gripen C, Gripen D
Guided bomb	Denel Dynamics	Umbani PGM	Hawk Mk 120 (Integrated but not acquired)
Free-fall bomb	Reunert Technology Systems	120 kg Fragmentation Bomb	Gripen C, Gripen D, Hawk Mk 120
Free-fall bomb	Reunert Technology Systems	120 kg Low-Drag Bomb	Gripen C, Gripen D, Hawk Mk 120
Free-fall bomb	Reunert Technology Systems	145 kg Bomb	Gripen C, Gripen D, Hawk Mk 120
Free-fall bomb	Reunert Technology Systems	460 kg Bomb	Gripen C, Gripen D, Hawk Mk 120
Free-fall bomb	Reunert Technology Systems	12.5 kg Practice Bomb	Hawk Mk 120
Free-fall bomb	Reunert Technology Systems	4.5 kg Practice Bomb	Hawk Mk 120
Guns	GIAT	F2 20mm Cannon	Rooivalk
Guns	Mauser-Werke Oberndorf	BK 27 27mm Cannon	Gripen C
Guns	Royal Small Arms Factory	Aden 30mm cannon	Hawk Mk 120
Guns	FN Herstal	7,62mm LMG	Oryx
Guns	FN Herstal	M3M 0.5 inch Machine Gun	Super Lynx 300
