= List of equipment of the Eritrean Army =

This is a list of equipment used by the Eritrean Army.

== Small arms ==
| Name | Image | Caliber | Type | Origin | Notes |
Pistols
| PM | | 9x18mm | Semi-automatic pistol | Soviet Union | |
Submachine guns
| Uzi | | 9×19mm | Submachine gun | Israel | |
Rifles
| AK | | 7.62×39mm | Assault rifle | Soviet Union | |
| AKM | | 7.62×39mm | Assault rifle | Soviet Union | |
| Vz. 58 | | 7.62×39mm | Assault rifle | Czechoslovakia | |
| M14 | | 7.62×51mm | Battle rifle | United States | |
| Beretta BM 59 | | 7.62×51mm | Battle rifle | Italy | |
Sniper rifles
| PSL | | 7.62×54mmR | DMR; Sniper rifle | Romania | |
Machine guns
| RPD | | 7.62×39mm | Light machine gun | Soviet Union | |
| PKM | | 7.62×54mmR | General-purpose machine gun | Soviet Union | |
| KPV | | 14.5×114mm | Heavy machine gun | Soviet Union | |
| DShK | | 12.7×108mm | Heavy machine gun | Soviet Union | |
Rocket propelled grenade launchers
| M79 | | 40 mm | Grenade launcher | United States | |
| RPG-7 | | 40mm | Rocket-propelled grenade | Soviet Union | |
| Type 69 | | 40mm | Rocket-propelled grenade | China | |

== Anti-tank weapons ==
| Name | Image | Type | Origin | Caliber | Notes |
|---|---|---|---|---|---|
| 9M14 Malyutka | | Anti-tank weapon | Soviet Union | | |
| 9M113 Konkurs | | Anti-tank weapon | Soviet Union | | |
| 9M133 Kornet-E | | Anti-tank weapon | Russia | | 80 in service |

== Vehicles ==
=== Tanks ===
| Name | Image | Type | Origin | Quantity | Notes |
|---|---|---|---|---|---|
| T-55A | | Medium tank | Soviet Union | 270 | 120 T-55As were ordered in 2004 from Bulgaria and delivered in 2005 |
| Chonma-ho | | Main battle tank | North Korea | Unknown | |

=== Scout cars ===
| Name | Image | Type | Origin | Quantity | Notes |
|---|---|---|---|---|---|
| BRDM-1 | | Scout car | Soviet Union | 40 | |
| BRDM-2 | | Scout car | Soviet Union | 40 | |

=== Infantry fighting vehicles ===
| Name | Image | Type | Origin | Quantity | Notes |
|---|---|---|---|---|---|
| BMP-1 | | Infantry fighting vehicle | Soviet Union | 15 | |

=== Armored personnel carriers ===
| Name | Image | Type | Origin | Quantity | Notes |
|---|---|---|---|---|---|
| BTR-60PB | | Amphibious Armored personnel carrier | Soviet Union | 25 | |
| BTR-152 | | Armored personnel carrier | Soviet Union | 25 | |
| MT-LB | | Amphibious Armored personnel carrier | Soviet Union; Bulgaria | 10 | Acquired from Bulgaria in 2005 |

=== Artillery ===
| Name | Image | Type | Origin | Quantity | Notes |
Rocket artillery
| BM-21 Grad | | Multiple rocket launcher | Soviet Union | 35 | |
| BM-27 Uragan | | Multiple rocket launcher | Soviet Union | 9 | Transferred from Belarus to Eritrea in 2007 |
Self-propelled artillery
| 2S1 Gvozdika | | Self-propelled artillery | Soviet Union | 32 | Acquired from Bulgaria |
| 2S5 Giatsint-S | | Self-propelled artillery | Soviet Union | 13 | |
Field artillery
| D-44 | | Field gun | Soviet Union | Unknown | |
| M-46 | | Field gun | Soviet Union | 39 | Acquired from Bulgaria in 1999 and 2004 |
| D-30 | | Howitzer | Soviet Union | Unknown | |

== Air defence systems ==
=== Man-portable air-defense systems ===
| Name | Image | Type | Origin | Quantity | Notes |
|---|---|---|---|---|---|
| 9K32 Strela-2 | | MANPADS | Soviet Union | Unknown | |
| 9K38 Igla | | MANPADS | Soviet Union | 200 | |

=== Towed anti-aircraft guns ===
| Name | Image | Type | Origin | Quantity | Notes |
|---|---|---|---|---|---|
| ZU-23-2 | | Autocannon | Soviet Union | 6 | |
| AZP S-60 | | Autocannon | Soviet Union | | |

=== Self-propelled anti-aircraft guns ===
| Name | Image | Type | Origin | Quantity | Notes |
|---|---|---|---|---|---|
| ZSU-23-4 | | SPAAG | Soviet Union | 3 | |
