= List of equipment of the South Sudan People's Defence Forces =

Equipment of the South Sudanese Army lists weapons, vehicles, aircraft, and other materiel that either are in service or have served with the South Sudan People's Defence Forces, since 2013.

Totals for each item are estimated as per sources cited. Items not yet in service but planned for future use are listed in a separate section. Status (confirmed or presumed) of each item is one of the following:

- INS = in active service
- RSV = in reserve (not in active service, stored for eventual use)
- RET = retired (no longer in service or in reserve)
- TBC = to be confirmed (current status unclear)

== Small arms ==
| Model | Manufacturer | Image | Origin | Type | Caliber | Notes |
Assault rifles, carbines & battle rifles
| IWI Galil ACE | Israel Weapon Industries | | Israel | Assault rifle Battle rifle | 7.62×51mm | |
| Type 81 | Norinco | | China | Assault rifle | | |
| Norinco CQ | Norinco | | China | Assault rifle | | |
| Type 56 | Norinco | | China | Assault rifle | | Chinese-made variant of the AK-47. |
| FN FAL | FN Herstal | | Belgium | Battle rifle | | |
| M1918 Browning | ? | | ? | Light machine gun | | |
Guided anti-tank weapons
| HJ-73D | ? | | China | Anti-tank guided missile | 125mm | Upgrade of the original HJ-73. Chinese development of the 9M14 Malyutka. |

=== Air defence systems ===
| Model | Manufacturer | Image | Origin | Type | Range | Status | Quantity | Notes |
Air defense cannons
| S-125 Neva/Pechora | JSC Defense Systems | | Soviet Union | SAM | ? | TBC | 16 | Serviceability doubtful. Illegally obtained between 2009 and 2016. |

== Armoured vehicles ==
| Type | Origin | Image | Quantity | Details |
Infantry mobility vehicle
| Mamba APC | South Africa | | ~1 | |

== Armored fighting vehicles ==
| Type | Origin | Image | Quantity | Details |
Main battle tanks
| T-55 | Soviet Union | | ? | A small number of T-55 tanks captured during the Second Sudanese Civil War. |
| T-72AV | Soviet Union | | 110 | |

== Artillery ==
| Type | Origin | Image | Quantity | Status | Details |
Self-propelled artillery
| 2S1 Gvozdika | Soviet Union | | 12 | TBC | |
| 2S3 Akatsiya | Soviet Union | | 12 | TBC | |
Rocket artillery
| BM-21 Grad | Soviet Union | | 15 | TBC | |
Field artillery
| Specific type unknown | | | 30 | TBC | 82mm mortars |

== Sources ==
- ConflictArm - WEAPONS AND AMMUNITION AIRDROPPED TO SPLA-iO FORCES IN SOUTH SUDAN - Nov 2014
