= List of equipment of the Dominican Army =

This is a list of the equipment used by the Dominican Army.

== Small arms ==
| Name | Image | Caliber | Type | Origin | Notes |
Pistols
| M1911 | | .45 ACP | Semi-automatic pistol | United States | |
| Browning Hi-Power | | 9×19mm | Semi-automatic pistol | Belgium | |
Submachine guns
| FN P90 | | FN 5.7×28mm | Submachine gun Personal defense weapon | Belgium | |
| Uzi | | 9×19mm | Submachine gun | Israel | |
| MAB-38 | | 9×19mm | Submachine gun | Kingdom of Italy | Standard Issue rifle |
Shotguns
| Daewoo USAS-12 | | 12 gauge | Automatic shotgun | South Korea | |
Rifles
| M4A1 | | 5.56×45mm | Carbine Assault rifle | United States | |
| IWI ARAD | | 5.56×45mm | assault rifle | Israel | Future standard service rifle |
| M16A2 | | 5.56×45mm | Assault rifle | United States | Standard Issue rifle |
| T65 | | 5.56×45mm | Assault rifle | Taiwan | |
| M14 | | 7.62×51mm | Battle rifle | United States | |
| ArmaLite AR-10 | | 7.62×51mm | Battle rifle | United States | Retired of service |
| FN FAL | | 7.62×51mm | Battle rifle | Belgium | Used only by cadets of the Academia Militar Batalla de las Carreras for training and Drill and Ceremonies Manual. |
| CETME Model C | | 7.62×51mm | Battle rifle | Spain | Retired of service |
| Heckler & Koch G3 | | 7.62×51mm | Battle rifle | Germany | Retired of service |
| Mauser Model 1895 | | 7×57mm | Bolt-action rifle | German Empire | Used by both the Honour Guard as a ceremonial rifle and by the cadets of the Dominican National Police. |
Machine guns
| Browning M1919 | | 7.62×51mm | Medium machine gun | United States | |
| Browning M2 | | .50 BMG | Heavy machine gun | United States | |
| Browning M1917 | | 7.62×51mm | Heavy machine gun | United States | Retired of service |
| M60 | | 7.62×51mm | General-purpose machine gun | United States | |
| FN MAG | | 7.62×51mm | General-purpose machine gun | Belgium | |
Grenade launchers
| M203 | | 40×46mm SR | Grenade launcher | United States | |
| M79 | | 40×46mm | Grenade launcher | United States | |

== Anti-tank weapons ==
| Name | Image | Type | Origin | Caliber | Notes |
|---|---|---|---|---|---|
| M40A1 | | Recoilless rifle | United States | 106mm | 20 in service. |
| AT4 | | Anti-tank weapon | Sweden | 84mm | |

== Vehicles ==
=== Tanks ===
| Name | Image | Type | Origin | Quantity | Status | Notes |
|---|---|---|---|---|---|---|
| M41 Walker Bulldog | | Light tank | United States | 12 | | |

== Armored personnel carriers ==
| Name | Image | Type | Origin | Quantity | Status | Notes |
|---|---|---|---|---|---|---|
| Cadillac Gage Commando | | Armored personnel carrier | United States | 8 | | |
| M3 half-track | | Half-track; Armored personnel carrier | United States | 4 | | |
| VBD-1 | | Armored personnel carrier | Dominican Republic | 1 | | |

== Utility vehicles ==
| Name | Image | Type | Origin | Quantity | Status | Notes |
|---|---|---|---|---|---|---|
| M151 | | Utility vehicle | United States | Unknown | | |
| URO VAMTAC ST5 | | Light utility vehicle | Spain | 80 | | |
| Jeep J8 | | Utility vehicle | United States | 15 | | |
| Beijing BJ2022 | | Utility vehicle | China | 8 | | |
Trucks
| M35 | | Utility truck | United States | Unknown | | |
| URO TT | | Utility truck | Spain | Unknown | | |

== Artillery ==
| Name | Image | Type | Origin | Quantity | Status | Notes |
Mortars
| M1 | | Mortar | United States | | | |
| M30 | | Mortar | United States | 4 in service. | | |
Field artillery
| M3 | | Anti-tank gun | United States | 20 | | |
| M3 | | Howitzer | United States | 4 | | |
| M101 | | Howitzer | United States | 4 | | |

== Air defence systems ==
| Name | Image | Type | Origin | Quantity | Status | Notes |
|---|---|---|---|---|---|---|
| Bofors L/60 | | Autocannon | Sweden | Unknown | | |
