= List of equipment of the Cameroon Army =

This is a list of the equipment currently used by the Cameroon Army.

== Infantry weapons ==
Model	Photo	Origin	Type	Notes
Small arms
M1911 pistol		United States; France	Pistol	
Browning Hi-Power		Belgium	Pistol	Standard-issue pistol for military police and all branches of army.
Manurhin MR 73		France	Revolver	
MAT-49		France	Submachine gun	
Heckler & Koch MP5		Germany	Submachine gun	Standard Issue sub-machine gun for the army and Special forces.
FN FAL		Belgium	Battle rifle	Standard issue rifle, used by paratroopers and presidential guards.
Galil		Israel	Assault rifle Carbine	Standard-issue assault rifle for all branches of army.
AK-47		Soviet Union; China	Assault rifle	Standard-issue assault rifle for all branches of army.
Zastava M21		Serbia and Montenegro	Assault rifle	Used by army in large amount.
M16 rifle		United States	Assault rifle Carbine	Used by army in large amount.
IWI Tavor		Israel	Carbine	Tavor CTAR variant are used by Special Forces.
Zastava M76		Yugoslavia	Designated marksman rifle	Standard-issue sniper rifles for the army and Special forces.
IMI Galat'z		Israel	Designated marksman rifle	Standard-issue sniper rifles for the army and Special forces.
IWI Negev		Israel	Light machine gun	Used by Special forces.
Heckler & Koch HK21		Germany	General-purpose machine gun	Used by the Army.
FN MAG		Belgium	General-purpose machine gun	Standard-issue machine gun for the army.
M2 Browning		United States; Belgium	Heavy machine gun	Standard-issue heavy machine gun for all branches of the army.
Anti-tank weapon
BGM-71 TOW		United States	Anti-tank missile	24 launchers and 250 missiles delivered in 1990.
MILAN		France	Anti-tank missile	6 launchers and 60 missiles delivered in 1982.
Recoilless rifles
Type 52		China	Recoilless rifle	13 units in service.
M40		United States	Recoilless rifle	40 M40A2 version in service.

== Vehicles ==
=== Armored vehicles ===
Model	Photo	Origin	Type	In service	Notes
Tank destroyers
WMA301 Assaulter		China	Tank destroyer	12	
Armoured personnel carriers/Infantry fighting vehicles
Ferret		United Kingdom	Armoured car	15	
Véhicule Blindé Léger		France	Armoured car	5	
M8 Greyhound		United States	Armoured car	8	Delivered from France in 1963.
RAM MK3		Israel	Armoured car	5	
Panhard AML-90		France	Armoured car	31	31 AML-90 Delivered via Bosnian Army in 2002.
AMX-10 RC		France	Armoured car	6	
Ratel 20		South Africa	Infantry fighting vehicle	12	
Type 07P		China	Infantry fighting vehicle	8	
Panthera T6		United Arab Emirates	Armoured personnel carrier	2	Used by Rapid Intervention Battalion.
Gaia Thunder		Israel	Armoured personnel carrier	16	
Cadillac Gage V-150 Commando		United States	Armoured personnel carrier	43	22 IFV versions armed with a 20 mm gun and a 90 mm gun.
ACMAT Bastion		France	Armoured personnel carrier	38	23 arrived 2015-2016 and 15 in 2017.
M3 Half-track		United States	Armoured personnel carrier	12	
Cougar H		United States; South Africa	Mine-Resistant Ambush Protected	6	
General Dynamics Land Systems PKSV		United States	Mine-Resistant Ambush Protected	27	
Armoured recovery vehicles
WZ-551 ARV		China	Armoured recovery vehicle	Unknown	

=== Unarmored vehicles ===
Model	Photo	Origin	Type	In service	Notes
Peugeot P4		France	Light utility vehicle	10	
Mercedes Wolf		Austria ______ West Germany Germany	Light utility vehicle	60	
Toyota Land Cruiser		Japan	Light utility vehicle	Unknown	
Renault TRM 2000		France	Truck	2	
ACMAT VLRA		France	Truck	30+	
Unimog		Germany	Truck	60	
FMTV		United States	Truck	2	2 A1P2 variant received in 2018. More units on order.

== Artillery ==
Model	Photo	Origin	Type	In service	Notes
Mortar
Cardom		Israel	120 mm mortar	18	
Mortier 120mm Rayé Tracté Modèle F1		France	120 mm mortar	16	
Towed artillery
M101		United States	105 mm towed howitzer	20	
M1982		Socialist Republic of Romania	130 mm towed howitzer	12	
Type 59		China	130 mm towed howitzer	12	
Soltam M-71		Israel	155 mm towed howitzer	8	
Self-propelled artillery
ATMOS 2000		Israel	155 mm self-propelled howitzer	18	
Multiple rocket launcher
BM-21 Grad		Soviet Union; Russia	122 mm multiple rocket launcher	20+	20 delivered from Romania in 1996. Some more from an unknown source in the 2010s.

== Air defence ==
Model	Photo	Origin	Type	In service	Notes
Towed anti-aircraft gun
Type 58		China	14.5mm anti-aircraft gun	18	
Oerlikon GDF-002		Switzerland	35 mm anti-aircraft gun	18	
Self-propelled anti-aircraft gun
RBY MK 1		Israel	20 mm self-propelled anti-aircraft gun	Unknown	Armed with TCM-20.

== Radars ==
Model	Photo	Origin	Type	In service	Notes
Watchman		United Kingdom	Air surveillance radar	1	Delivered in 1984.
