= List of equipment of the Armed Forces of Bosnia and Herzegovina =

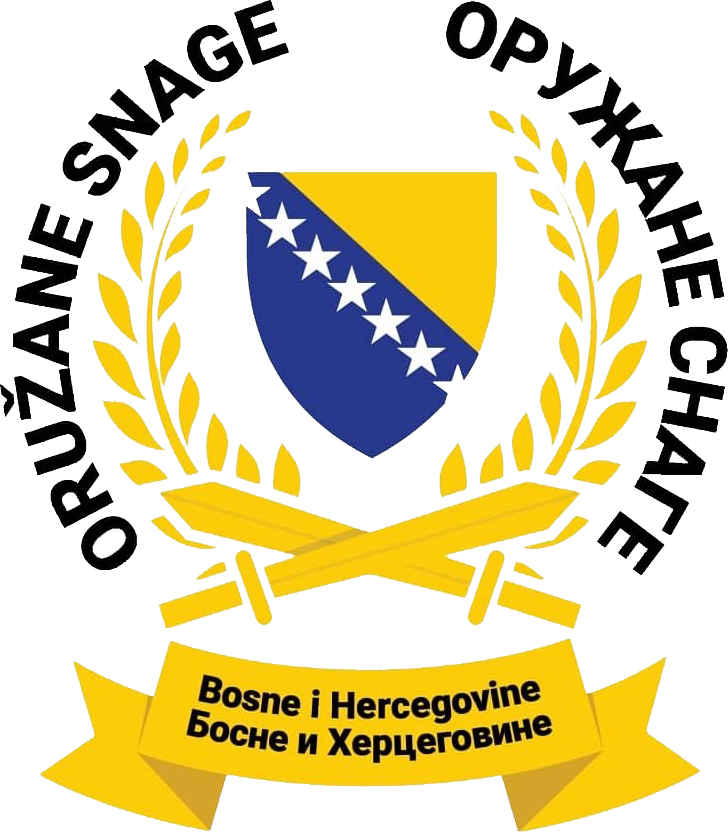

The inventory of AFBiH comprises mainly ageing Soviet-era equipment, though some new helicopters have been procured from the US. Bosnia-Herzegovina has little in the way of a domestic defence industry, with only the capability to produce small arms, ammunition and explosives.

This is a list of equipment used by the Armed Forces of Bosnia and Herzegovina.

== Small arms ==
Name	Origin	Photo	Type	Variant	Notes
Pistols
Zastava CZ 99	Yugoslavia		9 mm Para semi-auto pistol		Standard issue pistol.
HS2000	Croatia		9 mm Para semi-auto pistol		
Submachine guns
MP5	West Germany		9 mm Para submachine gun	M5, MP5A5, MP5KA1, MP5SFA2, MP5SFA3	
Assault rifles
M4 carbine	United States		5.56mm NATO assault rifle	M4A1	Standard issue carbine.
M16 rifle	United States		5.56mm NATO assault rifle	M16A4, M16A1	Standard issue rifle. 46,100 M-16 rifles donated through US Train and Equip Program in 1997.
Zastava M70	Yugoslavia		7.62×39mm assault rifle		M-70AB3, M-70A, M-70B1N, M-70AB2N, M-70A1. In reserve, a large part destroyed.
Sniper Rifles
Zastava M76	Yugoslavia		7.92x57mm Mauser		Designated Marksman Rifle
Zastava M93 Black Arrow	Federal Republic of Yugoslavia		12.7x108mm, .50BMG		Anti-Material Rifle
Barrett M82	United States		.50BMG		Anti-Material Rifle
Machine Guns
Zastava M72	Yugoslavia		7.62×39mm light machine gun	M72B1, M72	
Ultimax 100	Singapore		5.56mm NATO light machine gun	Mark 3/3A, Mark 2	In small numbers.
M249 light machine gun	United States		5.56mm NATO light machine gun	M249 PIP	
Zastava M84	Yugoslavia		7.62×54mmR general purpose machine gun	M84, M86	
M60 machine gun	United States		7.62mm NATO general purpose machine gun	M60E3, M60E4, M60E6	1000 M60 machine guns donated through US Train and Equip Program in 1997.
M240 machine gun	United States		7.62mm NATO general purpose machine gun		Aid from the United States
DShK	Soviet Union China		12.7×108mm heavy machine gun	DŠK, DŠKM, Type 54	
NSV	Soviet Union		12.7×108mm heavy machine gun		
M2 Browning	United States		.50 BMG heavy machine gun	M2HB, M2HB-QCB	Aid from the United States
M85 machine gun	United States		.50 BMG heavy machine gun		
Anti-tank weapons
Name	Origin	Photo	Type	Variant	Notes
AT4	Sweden; United States		Light anti-tank weapon	840	840 pcs AT4 light anti-tank weapons delivered from USA through Bosnian Train and Equip Program in 1997.
RPG-7	Soviet Union		Rocket-propelled grenade launcher		Unknown number.
MILAN	France; West Germany		Anti-tank missile		Unknown version and number.
HJ-8/Baktar-Shikan	China; Pakistan		Anti-tank missile		Unknown number.
9K115 Metis	Soviet Union		Anti-tank missile	NATO: AT-7 Saxhorn version	Unknown number.
9K111 Fagot	Soviet Union		Anti-tank missile	NATO: AT-4 Spigot version	Unknown number.
9M14 Malyutka	Soviet Union		Anti-tank missile	NATO: AT-3 Sagger version	Unknown number.

== Anti-drone system ==
Model	Origin	Type	Notes
Kangal	Turkey	Anti-drone jammer	

== Drones ==
Model	Origin	Type	Notes
Bayraktar TB2	Turkey	Attack drones	

== Helicopters ==
Model	Origin	Type	Notes
AgustaWestland AW119 Koala	United States	Ground support	

Model	Origin	Type	Notes
Bell Huey II	United States	Ground support	

== Armoured fighting vehicles ==
Model	Image	Origin	Quantity	Details
Main battle tanks
M60A3		United States	45	In 1997, 45 tanks were donated to the BiH Armed Forces through the US Train and Equip Program.
Armoured Personnel Carriers
M113A2		United States	20 (80)	80 M113A2 donated to the BiH Armed Forces through the US Train and Equip Program. There are currently 20 M113A2 in service with the armed forces, and the rest are in reserve.

== Armoured vehicles ==
Name	Origin	Type	In service	Notes
MRAP
BMC Kirpi II	Turkey	Mine-resistant ambush protected vehicle	4	Contract signed. 4 vehicles to be procured. A total of 32 are planned for the light infantry battalion group.
Infantry Mobility Vehicles
HMMWV	United States	Infantry Mobility Vehicle	79	Aid from the United States M1123 cargo/troop carrier, M1152 ambulance, M1152A1
Tank Destroyers
BRDM-2	Soviet Union	Anti-tank missile carrier	17	9P122 Malyutka and 9P133 Malyutka missiles.
BOV-1	Yugoslavia	Anti-tank missile carrier	32	Anti-tank vehicle armed with 9M14 Malyutka missiles. All are operational.
Type M 92/WZ-550	China	Anti-tank missile carrier	11	Anti-tank missile carrier with HJ-8 Red Arrow. All are operational.

== Artillery ==
Name	Origin	Type	In service	Notes
Towed artillery
D-30/D-30J	Soviet Union	Howitzer 122mm	132 (168)	12 of these are secondhand from Egypt. Donated from Egypt through US Train and Equip Program in 1997. 132 operational, 168 in reserve. Currently main howitzer of AF BiH.
M101	United States	Howitzer	24	Aid from the United States
Self-propelled artillery
APR 40	Socialist Republic of Romania / Romania	Multiple rocket launcher 122 mm	5(BM-21) 37(APR-40)	Currently 24 APR-40 in active service with AF BiH. Operational status of the rest is unknown.
Mortars
M-74/M-75	Yugoslavia	120 mm	(460) 100 M75	Currently 100 M-75 in active service with AF BiH. Operational status of rests is unknown.
M-69	Yugoslavia	82 mm	81	Operational status is unknown. In reserve.
