= List of equipment of the Ghana Army =

This is a list of the equipment used by the Ghana Army.

== Small arms ==
Name	Image	Caliber	Type	Origin	Notes
Pistols
Browning Hi-Power		9×19mm	Semi-automatic pistol	Belgium	
Submachine guns
Sten		9×19mm	Submachine gun	United Kingdom	
Sterling		9×19mm	Submachine gun	United Kingdom	
Heckler & Koch MP5		9×19mm	Submachine gun	West Germany	
Rifles
AKM		7.62×39mm	Assault rifle	Soviet Union	Used by honor guards.
M16A2		5.56×45mm	Assault rifle	United States	
M4		5.56×45mm	Carbine Assault rifle	United States	Used by paratroopers.
M14		7.62×51mm	Battle rifle	United States	
FN FAL		7.62×51mm	Battle rifle	Belgium	
Heckler & Koch G3		7.62×51mm	Battle rifle	West Germany	
Machine guns
Bren		7.62×51mm	Light machine gun	United Kingdom	
RPD		7.62×39mm	Squad automatic weapon	Soviet Union	
RPK		7.62×39mm	Squad automatic weapon	Soviet Union	
Browning M1919		7.62×51mm	Medium machine gun	United States	
MG-3		7.62×51mm	General-purpose machine gun	West Germany	
FN MAG		7.62×51mm	General-purpose machine gun	Belgium	
M60		7.62×51mm	General-purpose machine gun	United States	
KPV		14.5×114mm	Heavy machine gun	Soviet Union	
DShK		12.7×108mm	Heavy machine gun	Soviet Union	
Browning M2		.50 BMG	Heavy machine gun	United States	
Rocket propelled grenade launchers
RPG-7		40mm	Rocket-propelled grenade	Soviet Union	

== Anti-tank weapons ==
Name	Image	Type	Origin	Caliber	Notes
Carl Gustav		Recoilless rifle	Sweden	84mm	

== Armoured vehicles ==
=== Armoured reconnaissance vehicles ===
Name	Image	Type	Origin	Quantity	Status	Notes
EE-9 Cascavel		Armored car	Brazil	3	Unknown	No photos available of vehicle in service
Mowag Piranha I		Armored fighting vehicle	Switzerland	63		4 of the units are armed with a 25mm gun.

=== Infantry fighting vehicles ===
Name	Image	Type	Origin	Quantity	Status	Notes
Ratel-90		Infantry fighting vehicle	South Africa	24	Active	Seen in exercises in 2024
Ratel-20		Infantry fighting vehicle	South Africa	15	Active	Seen in exercises in 2021

=== Armored personnel carriers ===
Name	Image	Type	Origin	Quantity	Status	Notes
WZ-523		Armored personnel carrier	China	82		
VBTP-MR Guarani		Amphibious Armored personnel carrier	Brazil	11		
Alvis Tactica		Armored personnel carrier	United Kingdom	20		
Maverick		Armored personnel carrier	South Africa	20		
Terrex AV-81		Armoured combat vehicle	Singapore	19		19 Sentinel IIs in total, 6 Sentinel IIs in 8x8 equipped with Elbit Systems UT30 turrets with 10 Sentinel IIs in 6x6 for recon missions
Sherpa Light		Armored personnel carrier	France	2		
Otokar Cobra and Otokar Cobra II		Infantry mobility vehicle	Turkey	73		
International MXT-MV		Infantry mobility vehicle	United Kingdom	70		Provided by the United Kingdom.

=== Mine-Resistant Ambush Protected ===
Name	Image	Type	Origin	Quantity	Status	Notes
STREIT Typhoon		MRAP	United Arab Emirates	50		
Casspir		MRAP	South Africa	4		

== Artillery ==
Name	Image	Type	Origin	Quantity	Status	Notes
Rocket artillery
Type 63		Multiple rocket launcher	China	3		
PHL-81		Multiple rocket launcher	China	3		
Mortars
Krh/40		Mortar	Finland	28		
Field artillery
D-30		Howitzer	Soviet Union	6		

== Air defence systems ==
Name	Image	Type	Origin	Quantity	Status	Notes
ZPU-4		Anti-aircraft gun	Soviet Union	2		
ZPU-2		Anti-aircraft gun	Soviet Union	4		
ZU-23-2		Autocannon	Soviet Union	4		
FN-6		MANPADS	China	100		
9K32 Strela-2		MANPADS	Soviet Union	200		
