= List of equipment of the Land Forces of the Democratic Republic of the Congo =

The following is a list of equipment of the Land Forces of the Democratic Republic of the Congo from creation to present day.

== Small arms ==
Model	Image	Origin	Type	Caliber	Details
Pistols
Browning HP		Belgium; United States	Semi-automatic pistol	9×19mm Parabellum	
Smith & Wesson Model 39		United States	Semi-automatic pistol	9×19mm Parabellum	
Heckler & Koch P7		West Germany Germany	Semi-automatic pistol	9×19mm Parabellum	P7 P7M13 model used.
Rifles
AK-47		Soviet Union	Assault rifle	7.62×39mm	
AKM		Soviet Union	Assault rifle	7.62×39mm	
Emtan MZ-4P		Israel	Assault rifle	5.56×45mm NATO	Used by Special Forces.
FN FNC		Belgium	Assault rifle	5.56×45mm NATO	
M16A1		United States	Assault rifle	5.56×45mm NATO	The M16A1 HB machine gun variant is also used.
SIG SG 540		Switzerland	Assault rifle	5.56×45mm NATO	
CETME Model 58		Francoist Spain	Battle rifle	7.62×51mm NATO	
FN FAL		Belgium	Battle rifle	7.62×51mm NATO	The Heavy Barrel machine gun variant is also used.
IMI Galil		Israel	Battle rifle	7.62×51mm NATO	
Machine guns
Bren L4		First Czechoslovak Republic (design); United Kingdom (manufacture)	Light machine gun	7.62×51mm NATO	
FN MAG		Belgium	General-purpose machine gun	7.62×51mm NATO	
M60		United States	General-purpose machine gun	7.62×51mm NATO	
DShK		Soviet Union	Heavy machine gun	12.7×108mm	
M2 Browning		United States	Heavy machine gun	.50 BMG	

== Anti-tank weapons ==
Model	Image	Origin	Type	Caliber	Details
Rocket launchers
RPG-7		Soviet Union	Rocket-propelled grenade	40 mm	
Recoilless guns
M18		United States	Recoilless rifle	57 mm	
SPG-9		Soviet Union	Recoilless rifle	73 mm	
M20		United States	Recoilless rifle	75 mm	
M40A1		United States	Recoilless rifle	106 mm	
Anti-tank guns
Type 56		China	Anti-tank gun	85 mm	10 in service as of 2024.

== Vehicles ==
Model	Image	Origin	Type	Quantity	Details
Tanks
PT-76		Soviet Union	Light tank	10	
Type 62		China	Light tank	30	
T-55		Soviet Union	Medium tank	32	
Type 59		China	Main battle tank	12-17	
T-64BV1		Soviet Union; Ukraine	Main battle tank	25	
T-72AV		Soviet Union	Main battle tank	100	
Armored fighting vehicles
Panhard AML-60		France	Armoured car	Up to 17	
Panhard AML-90		France	Armoured car	14	
EE-9 Cascavel		Military dictatorship in Brazil	Armoured car	19	
BMP-1		Soviet Union	Infantry fighting vehicle	20	
BTR-50		Soviet Union	Armoured personnel carrier	3	
MT-LB		Soviet Union	Armoured personnel carrier	6	
BTR-60PB		Soviet Union	Armoured personnel carrier	30–70	
Mbombe 4		South Africa	Armoured personnel carrier	20	
Panhard M3		France	Armoured personnel carrier	58	
TH 390 Fahd		Egypt / West Germany	Armoured personnel carrier		
Calidus MCAV-20		United Arab Emirates	Infantry mobility vehicle	30	
Logistics
Auverland/SAMO		France	Utility		
M151		United States	Utility		
ACMAT		France	Truck		
M35		United States	Medium truck		M44 variant also used.
M809		United States	Heavy truck		

== Artillery ==
Model	Image	Origin	Caliber	Quantity	Details
Mortars
Brandt Mle 1935		France	60 mm		
PRB NR 475 A1		Belgium	81 mm	100	
M-37M		Soviet Union	82 mm	400	
M30		United States	107 mm		
MO-120-RT		France	120 mm	28	The MO-120-LT variant is also used.
Towed
M-30		Soviet Union	122 mm	77	
D-30		Soviet Union	122 mm	77	
Type 60		China	122 mm	77	
Type 59		China	130 mm	42	The Type 59-I variant is also used.
D-20		Soviet Union	152 mm	6	Reportedly used.
Self-propelled
2S1 Gvozdika		Soviet Union	122 mm	6	
2S3 Akatsiya		Soviet Union	152 mm	10	
Multiple rocket launchers
Type-63		China	107 mm	12	
BM-21 Grad		Soviet Union	122 mm	24	
RM-70		Czechoslovakia	122 mm		
RM-51		Czechoslovakia	128 mm	6	
Type 82		China	130 mm	3	
Katyusha		Soviet Union	132 mm	12	

== Air defence ==
Model	Image	Origin	Caliber	Quantity	Details
Man-portable air-defense systems
9K32 Strela-2		Soviet Union	72 mm		
Anti-aircraft guns
ZPU-4		Soviet Union	14.5×114mm	12	
M-1939		Soviet Union	37 mm	52	

== Bibliography ==
- Foss, Christopher F.; Gander, Terry J., eds. (1999). Jane's Military Vehicles and Logistics, 1999-2000 (20th ed.). Jane's Information Group. ISBN 978-0-7106-1912-9.
- International Institute for Strategic Studies (2024). "Chapter Eight: Sub-Saharan Africa". The Military Balance. 124 (1). Taylor & Francis: 458–531. doi:10.1080/04597222.2024.2298597. ISSN 0459-7222.
- Jones, Richard D.; Ness, Leland, eds. (2010). Jane's Infantry Weapons 2010-2011 (36th ed.). Janes Information Group. ISBN 978-0-7106-2908-1.
