= List of equipment of the Royal Bhutan Army =

List of the military equipment used by the Royal Bhutan Army. The RBA is a mobile infantry force exceptionally armed with weapons largely supplied by India.

== Small arms ==
Name	Image	Caliber	Type	Origin	Notes
Pistols
Browning Hi-Power		9×19mm Parabellum	Semi-automatic pistol	Belgium / United States	To be replaced by Glock-17
Glock-17		9x19mm Parabellum	Semi-automatic pistol	Austria	
Sub-Machine guns
Heckler & Koch MP5		9x19mm	Sub-machine gun	West Germany	
Uzi		9x19mm Parabellum	Sub-machine gun	Israel	
Rifles
INSAS		5.56×45mm	Assault rifle	India	1B1 Variant; likely to be phased out.
AK-74M		5.45x39mm	Assault rifle	Soviet Union Russia	Widely used, preferred over the INSAS.
AK-103		7.62x39mm	Assault Rifle	Russia	Also widely used.
AK-47		7.62x39mm	Assault rifle	Soviet Union	limited use; mostly used for training.
MPi-KM		7.62x39mm	Assault rifle	East Germany	
IWI Galil ACE		5.45×39mm	Assault rifle	Israel	Used by specialized units.
SR 88		5.56x45mm	Assault rifle	Singapore	Used by the Royal Body Guards.
Close Quarters Battle Receiver		5.56x45mm	Assault rifle	United States	
M4 carbine		5.56x45mm	Assault rifle	United States	Used by specialized units
M4A1		5.56x45mm	Assault rifle	United States	
FN SCAR		5.56x45mm	Assault rifle	Belgium / United States	
M16A2		5.56×45mm	Assault rifle	United States	
M16A4		5.56x45mm	Assault rifle	United States	
L1A1 Self-Loading Rifle		7.62x51mm	Battle Rifle	United Kingdom	Training purpose, used by the police force.
FN FAL		7.62×51mm	Battle rifle	Belgium	Training purpose, used by the police force.
Heckler & Koch G3		7.62×51mm	Battle rifle	West Germany	Used by sentries, most likely used by the police force.
Designated Marksman Rifles
M110 Semi-Automatic Sniper System		7.62x51mm	Designated Marksman Rifle	United States	
Anti-Material Rifles
Barrett M82		.50 BMG	Anti-Material rifle	United States	
Machine guns
Bren		7.62x51mm	Light Machine Gun	First Czechoslovak Republic / United Kingdom	seen mounted on vehicles.
Ultimax 100		5.56x45mm	Light Machine Gun	Singapore	
FN Minimi		5.56x45mm	Light Machine Gun	Belgium	Limited use.
FN MAG		7.62x51mm	General Purpose Machine Gun	Belgium	

== Armoured personnel carriers ==
Name	Image	Type	Origin	Quantity	Status	Notes
BTR-60		Armored personnel carrier	Soviet Union	27		
First Win		Infantry mobility vehicle	Thailand / Malaysia	25		15 used for peacekeeping missions, 10 used by the Police.

== Heavy weapons ==
Name	Image	Type	Origin	Quantity	Status	Notes
Air defence
Bofors 40 mm Automatic Gun L/70		Anti-aircraft gun	Sweden	77		
Oerlikon GDF		Anti-aircraft gun	Switzerland	54		
Mortars
81 mm mortar		Mortar		(Unknown)		
120mm mortar		Mortar		(Unknown)		

=== Anti-tank weapons ===
Name	Image	Type	Origin	Quantity	Status	Notes
Grenade launchers
GP-25		Grenade launcher	Soviet Union			
Rocket launchers
RPG-7		Rocket-propelled grenade	Soviet Union			
RPG-30		Rocket-propelled grenade	Russia			
Recoilless rifles
Carl Gustaf 8.4 cm recoilless rifle		Recoilless rifle	Sweden			
M40 recoilless rifle		Recoilless rifle	United States			
