= List of active military aircraft of the French Armed Forces =

The following is a list of military aircraft currently in service in the three main branches of the French Armed Forces: French Army, French Navy, and French Air and Space Force.

== Air Force ==
=== Fixed wing aircraft ===
Aircraft	Origin	Role	Variant	In service	Notes
Combat aircraft
Dassault Rafale	France	Swingrole fighter	Rafale B / C	112 (+42 on order)	Tranche 5: 42 ordered to the F4 standard ordered. Fleet being modernised to the standard F4. All the Rafale are at the standard F3, F3-R, F4.1 and F4.2.
Dassault Mirage 2000	France	Multirole fighter	Mirage 2000-5F	22	Planned to be retired around 2030, and be replaced by the Rafale on order.
Dassault Mirage 2000	France	Fighter bomber	Mirage 2000D - RMV	50	Of the 52 Mirage 2000D, 50 were modernised to the standard RMV (mid-life upgrade) by June 2026.
Dassault Mirage 2000	France	Fighter bomber	Mirage 2000D	2	Of the 52 Mirage 2000D, 50 were modernised to the standard RMV (mid-life upgrade) by June 2026.
Military transport aircraft
Airbus A400M	Spain, France, Germany, United Kingdom, Belgium, Turkey	Strategic airlifter / tactical airlifter	–	20 (+25 on order)	25 A400M, 5 of which have a refuelling capacity (and are listed in the tankers).
Lockheed C-130 Hercules	United States	Tactical airlifter	C-130H-30	12	Of the 12 aircraft, 3 were upgraded. The aircraft entered service in 1987. France is planning to retire the C-130H in the near future. The successor is expected to be the FMTC.
Lockheed Martin C-130 Super Hercules	United States	Tactical airlifter	C-130J-30	2	
CASA CN235	Spain	Tactical airlifter	CN-235-200	19	19 CN-235-200 entered service in 1990. 8 CN-235-300 ordered in 2010. Modernisation of the avionic of the 27 CN235 started in 2023. The successor is expected to be the FMTC.
CASA CN235	Spain	Tactical airlifter	CN-235-300	8	19 CN-235-200 entered service in 1990. 8 CN-235-300 ordered in 2010. Modernisation of the avionic of the 27 CN235 started in 2023. The successor is expected to be the FMTC.
VIP transport and liaison aircraft
Airbus A330	France; Germany	Government transport	A330-200	1	Entered in service in November 2010, purchased second hand.
Dassault Falcon 900	France	Government transport	Falcon 900	2	
Dassault Falcon 900	France	Government transport	Falcon 900 EX-EASY	2	It replaced the family of Falcon 2000LX.
Dassault Falcon 7X	France	Government transport	–	2	Entered service in 2009 and 2010 respectively.
DHC-6 Twin Otter	Canada	Liaison aircraft / special forces light transport aircraft	–	5	Entered service in 1978.
Daher TBM700	France	Liaison aircraft	TBM700A	16	Entered service in 1990.
Aerial refueling
Airbus A330 MRTT Phénix	Spain; France; Germany	Tanker / command node /transporter / MEDEVAC	A330-200 MRTT	13 (+2 on order)	Framework contract signed in 2014 for up to 12 A330 MRTT: FW Batch 1: November 2014, 1 × A330 MRTT; FW Batch 2: December 2015, 8 × A330 MRTT; FW Batch 3: December 2018, 3 × A330 MRTT; August 2020, 3 × A330 MRTT (1 new build, 2 second hand); Refuelling equipment: 1 × ARBS refuelling boom; 2 × Cobham 905E underwing pods; Internal capabilities: C2 and relay node (MELISSA SatCom with Syracuse IV satellites); Passenger transport: 272 passengers; 2 × MEDEVAC: "MORPHEE" kits with up to 10 ICU patients and 88 passengers
Airbus A400M	United Kingdom	Aerial refueling / tactical airlifter / strategic airlifter	A400M MRTT	5	Five refuelling kit for the A400M purchased, they refuel aircraft and helicopters. The refuelling pods are the Cobham 908E WDE, which are placed under the wing and have the capability to refuel helicopters.
Lockheed Martin KC-130 Super Hercules	United States	Aerial refueling / tactical airlifter	KC-130J	2	It entered service in 2019.
Special role aircraft
Boeing E-3 Sentry	United States	AWACS	E-3F	4	It entered service in May 1991.
Saab GlobalEye	Sweden; Canada	AEW&C	Global 6500 - GlobalEye	0 (+2 on order)	2 ordered in December 2025, with an option for 2 more aircraft. The delivery is planned for 2029 - 2032. Successor of the E-3 Sentry.
Dassault Archange	France	SIGINT	Falcon 8X Archange	0 (+2 on order)	Two ordered in 2019, a minimum of three aircraft planned.
Beechcraft King Air 350ER	United States; Belgium; France	ISR	ALSR Vador	2 (+1 on order)	8 aircraft were planned with the LPM 2019 - 2025, but only 3 were ordered. The third is planned to be deployed in Djibouti.
Demonstration aircraft
Alpha Jet (Dassault / Dornier)	France; Germany	Aerobatic display	Alpha Jet E	12	Aircraft used by the Patrouille de France since 1981.
Extra 330	Germany	Aerobatic display	–	3	Aircraft operated by the "Équipe de voltige de l'Armée de l'Air et de l'Espace" since 2005.
Trainer aircraft
Dassault Mirage 2000	France	Operational conversion aircraft	Mirage 2000-5F-SF2	7	It entered service in 1993, 7 remain in service.
Alpha Jet (Dassault / Dornier)	France; Germany	Aggressor / JTAC training	Alpha Jet E	30	The advanced training mission was transferred entirely to the Pilatus PC-21. The training role of the Alpha Jet is exclusively focuses on the "Red Air" force (OPFOR / aggressor) to train air-to-air combat, and JTAC training.
Pilatus PC-21	Switzerland	Advanced trainer / Lead-in fighter training	–	26	Purchased as part of the MENTOR 1 programme (replacement of Alpha Jet, and the Epsilon): Dec. 2016: 17 PC-21; Jul. 2021: 9 PC-21The aircrafr entered service in 2018. (It has a secondary role as surveillance aircraft.)
Pilatus PC-7	Switzerland	Basic trainer / ab initio trainer	PC-7 MKX	0 (+22 on order)	Contract signed in January 2025 with Babcock to provide 22 aircraft, as art of the MENTOR 2 programme (replacement of the Cirrus SR20 and Grob 120). The contract is signed for 17 years. 12 simulators for this aircraft (provided by Exail) to be positionned at the Salon-de-Provence Air Base.
Embraer EMB 121 Xingu	Brazil	Multi-engine trainer / Liaison	–	16	It is used to train transport pilots. It is used in a secondary role as a liaison aircraft.
Grob G120	Germany	Ab initio trainer	G120A-F	18	Fleet outsourced to the Airbus Flight Academy (G120 after SR20 / SR22 in the training curriculum). Being replaced by the PC-7 MKX.
Cirrus SR20	United States	Ab initio trainer	–	16	Fleet outsourced to the Airbus Flight Academy. Being replaced by the PC-7 MKX.
Cirrus SR22	United States	Ab initio trainer	–	9	Fleet outsourced to the Airbus Flight Academy. Being replaced by the PC-7 MKX.

=== Rotorcraft ===
Aircraft	Origin	Role	Variant	In service	Notes
Medium military helicopters
Airbus Helicopters H225M Caracal	France	CSAR / tactical transport / MEDEVAC	–	11	Orders: Early years 2000: 6 × H225M for the CSAR mission, delivered between February 2005 and May 2007; April 2009: 5 × H225M ordered
Airbus Helicopters H225M Caracal	France	Medium utility / SAR	–	8	8 H225M Caracal ordered in April 2021 to replace the SA330 Puma. The first delivery took place in January 2025, and the last was delivered in June 2026.
Airbus Helicopters H225M Caracal	France	Special forces helicopter	H225FS	0 (+ 8 to be transferred from the ALAT)	8 helicopters to be transferred from the 4th Special Forces Helicopter Regiment of the French Army Light Aviation once they receive the new NH90 FS. These 8 helicopters are equipped with a refuelling pole.
Eurocopter EC225 Super Puma Mk2	France	SAR	EC225LP	2	Transferred from the French Navy to the 1/67 Pyrénées Squadron as the French Navy introduced the NH90 Caïnman Marine for this mission.
Sud-Aviation SA330 Puma	France	Medium utility / SAR	SA.330H	15	It entered service in 1974. It is being replaced by the Caracal.
Light military helicopters
Airbus Helicopters H160M -Guépard	France	MASA / SAR / ISR	–	0 (+40 on order)	169 H160M ordered by the French Armed Forces, among which, 40 for the French Air and Space Force. In the Air Force, it will replace the Eurocopter AS555 Fennec 2.
Eurocopter AS555 Fennec	France	MASA / SAR / MEDEVAC	–	40	It entered service in 1990. To be replaced by the Airbus Helicopters H160M -Guépard.
VIP transport
Aerospatiale AS332 Super Puma (Airbus H215)	France	VIP transport	–	3	It entered service in 1984 as a government transport helicopter. The helicopters are being replaced by the Caracal.

=== Unmanned aerial vehicles ===
Aircraft	Origin	Role	Variant	In service	Notes
Combat drones
General Atomics MQ-9 Reaper	United States	MALE; UCAV / ISTAR	MQ-9 block 5 ER	12	In service since 2013, with multiple orders placed, totalling 4 systems (each with 3 drones).
Eurodrone	Germany; France; Italy; Spain	MALE; UCAV / ISTAR	–	0 (+12 on order)	The contract was signed in February 2022. It includes 4 systems, each with 3 drones, and it was ordered with multiple other nations.

== Navy ==
=== Fixed-wing aircraft ===
Aircraft	Origin	Role	Variant	In service	Notes
Combat aircraft
Dassault Rafale	France	Swingrole fighter	Rafale M F3-R / F4	42	
Transport aircraft
Dassault Falcon 10	France	Liaison aircraft	Falcon 10MER	6	Being partially replaced by the Pilatus PC-24.
Embraer EMB 121 Xingu	Brazil	Liaison aircraft	–	10	
Special role aircraft
Grumman E-2 Hawkeye	United States	AEW&C	E-2C Hawkeye 2000	3	Entered service in 1998.
Grumman E-2 Hawkeye	United States	AEW&C	E-2D	0 (+3 on order)	Planned to enter service at the end of 2027.
Bréguet Atlantique 2	France	ASW, MPA	Standard 5	4	Out of 22 Atlantique 2 in service, 18 were modernised to the Standard 6. To be replaced by the Airbus A321 XLR MPA, which is in development since February 2025.
Bréguet Atlantique 2	France	ASW, MPA	Standard 6	18	Out of 22 Atlantique 2 in service, 18 were modernised to the Standard 6. To be replaced by the Airbus A321 XLR MPA, which is in development since February 2025.
Dassault Falcon 20	France	MSA	Falcon 200 Gardian	5	To be replaced by the Falcon 2000LXS Albatros.
Dassault Falcon 50	France	MSA	Falcon 50M Triton	8	To be replaced by the Falcon 2000LXS Albatros.
Dassault Falcon 2000	France	MSA and intervention	Falcon 2000LXS Albatros	2 (+10 on order)	Successor of the Falcon 200 Gardian and the 50M Triton. 7 ordered in December 2020, 5 ordered in October 2025. 2 delivered in September 2026.
Trainer aircraft
Pilatus PC-24	Switzerland	Multi-engine trainer / Liaison	–	2 (+1 on order)	Successor of part of the Dassault Falcon 10MER. 3 aircraft PC-24 rented for the mission. 2 first aircraft delivered in March and August 2026.
Mudry CAP 10	France	Basic trainer / aerobatics	CAP 10	5	
Mudry CAP 10	France	Basic trainer / aerobatics	CAP 10C	2	
British Aerospace Jetstream 41	United Kingdom	Military crew training	–	1	Aircraft provided by AVDEF, a French company. Used for maritime patrol and surveillance rear crew training.

=== Rotorcraft ===
Aircraft	Origin	Role	Variant	In service	Notes
Helicopters
NHIndustries NH90	France / Germany / Italy / Netherlands	ASW / ASuW; SAR	NH90NFH Caïman Marine	27	
Eurocopter AS565 Panther	France	Surveillance / intervention / utility	AS565SA Panther	16	Helicopters of the Flotilla 36F are embarked on frigates.
Eurocopter AS365 Dauphin	France	SAR	SA365 N SPI (Secours Protection Intervention)	6	Operated by the Flotilla 35F.
Eurocopter AS365 Dauphin	France	SAR	SA365 F Pedro	3	Operated by the Flotilla 35F from the Charles de Gaulle aircraft carrier as a rescue helicopter.
Eurocopter AS365 Dauphin	France	SAR	Dauphin N3+ FI (flotte intérimaire)	2	Operated in French Polynedsia by the Flotilla 35F.
Airbus Helicopters H160	France	SAR	–	6	Interim fleet of the French Navy, rented to Babcock.
Airbus Helicopters H160M -Guépard	France	ASW / ASuW; SAR / Utility	–	0 (+49 on order)	169 H160M ordered by the French Armed Forces, among which, 49 for the French Navy.

=== Unmanned aerial vehicles ===
Aircraft	Origin	Role	Variant	In service	Notes
UAVs
Schiebel Camcopter S-100	Austria	ISR UAS helicopter	S-100F	3 (+5 on order)	Entered service in 2012. 5 more systems ordered in 2026. Note: 1 system is equipped with two drones, so there are 6 drones in service, 10 on order.
Airbus Helicopters VSR700	France	ISR UAS helicopter / transport	–	0 (+6 on order)	6 ordered in January 2026. Based on the Cabri G2 helicopter.

== Army ==
Aircraft	Origin	Role	Variant	In service	Notes
Military transport aircraft
Pilatus PC-6 Porter	Switzerland	Tactical transport / liaison	–	5	Aircraft modernised in the early 2020s.
Socata TBM 700	France	Liaison	–	9	
Combat helicopters
Eurocopter Tiger	France / Germany / Spain	Attack	HAD (Mk I)	67	HAD being modified to HAP Mk II standard. Project to modify all the HAP to the Mk III standard.
Eurocopter Tiger	France / Germany / Spain	Attack	HAP (Mk I and Mk II)	67	HAD being modified to HAP Mk II standard. Project to modify all the HAP to the Mk III standard.
Aérospatiale SA 342 Gazelle		Reconnaissance / attack helicopter	SA 342M	80	
Transport and utility helicopters
NHIndustries NH90	France / Germany / Italy / Netherlands	Medium utility	NH90 TTH Caïman	63	
NHIndustries NH90	France / Germany / Italy / Netherlands	Special forces helicopter	NH90 TTH Caïman (standard 2) - special forces	0 (+18 on order)	10 ordered in October 2020, 8 ordered in December 2023.
Airbus Helicopters H225M Caracal	France	Special forces helicopter	H225FS	8	8 helicopters to be transferred from the 4th Special Forces Helicopter Regiment of the French Army Light Aviation to the French Air Force once they receive the new NH90 FS.
Eurocopter AS532 Cougar	France	Medium utility / tactical transport	–	24	
Sud-Aviation SA330 Puma	France	Medium utility	–	15	
Airbus Helicopters H160M -Guépard	France	Multi-role	–	0 (+ 80 on order)	The profile of missions includes reconnaissance, transport, liaison, armed support, etc.
Training aircraft
Eurocopter AS555 Fennec	France	Rotorcraft trainer	AS555 UN Fennec 2	18	
