= List of equipment of the Kosovo Security Force =

The equipment currently in use with the Kosovo Security Force includes small arms, combat vehicles, drones, light artillery and transport vehicles. Its main mission is the defence of the independence, sovereignty and territorial integrity of Kosovo, military support for civilian authorities, and participation in international peacekeeping operations. The Kosovo Security Force is currently in the final stage of its process of transitioning into the Kosovo Armed Forces and it is currently building its combat capabilities with support by NATO members, with the goal of the Force being inter-operationable with NATO.

== Infantry weapons ==
=== Handguns ===
Model	Image	Caliber	Origin	Quantity	Note
Glock 17		9×19mm Parabellum	Austria		Standard Sidearm.
SIG Sauer M17		9×19mm Parabellum	United States		Standard Sidearm for Army Special Forces. Special characteristics: Personalised with KSF Logo and name, both Black and Brown available.

=== Assault rifles ===
Model	Image	Caliber	Origin	Quantity	Note
MPT-55		5.56×45mm NATO	Turkey		
IMI Galil		5.56×45mm NATO	Israel		
Heckler & Koch G36		5.56×45mm NATO	Germany		Standard Rifle.
M4A1		5.56×45mm NATO	United States		
M5 Colt Carbine		5.56×45mm NATO	United States		
MPT-76		7.62×51mm NATO	Turkey		

=== Ceremonial Guard guns ===
These guns are used by Guard of Honour only. It is used for diplomatic reception, Three-Volley Salute etc.

Model	Image	Caliber	Origin	Quantity	Note
Zastava M59/66		7.62×39mm	Yugoslavia		Standard Gun of Guard of Honour
M4A1		5.56×45mm NATO	United States		This gun is also used for combat purposes. It is seen in Three-Volley Salute during the ceremony of KLA epic ceremony in March.

=== Machine guns ===
Model	Image	Caliber	Origin	Quantity	Note
M249		5.56×45mm NATO	United States		
PMT-76-57A		7.62×51mm NATO	Turkey		
M240		7.62×51mm NATO	United States		
M60E6		7.62×51mm NATO	United States		
M2A1		.50 BMG	United States		

=== Precision rifles ===
Model	Image	Calibre	Origin	Quantity	Note
SIG Sauer SIG716 DMR		7.62×51mm NATO	United States		
Accuracy International AWM G22A2		.300 Winchester Magnum	United Kingdom		Used by Kosovo Special Forces on KSF
Barrett M82		.50 BMG	United States		
Barrett M99		.50 BMG	United States		The Barrett M99 is a single-shot anti-materiel rifle.

=== Grenade launchers ===
Model	Image	Caliber	Origin	Quantity	Note
M203 grenade launcher		40×46mm grenade	United States		Attached to M4 carbine
Heckler & Koch AG36		40×46mm	Germany		Attached to rifle.
MK 19		40×53mm	United States		Mounted on armored vehicles.

=== Anti-tank weapons ===
Model	Image	Caliber	Origin	Quantity	Note
M72 LAW; HAR-66		66 mm	United States; Turkey		
Panzerfaust 3		110 mm	Germany	unknown	Announced by Kosovo Defence Minister Ejup Maqedonci on a report about the achievements of KSF in December 2025.
FGM-148 Javelin		127 mm	United States	(246 on order)	246 Javelin FGM-148F missiles (including six fly-to-buy missiles) and 24 Javelin Lightweight Command Launch Units (LWCLUs) on order.
OMTAS		160 mm	Turkey		

=== Weapon station ===
Model	Image	Caliber	Origin	Quantity	Note
Aselsan SARP and SARP DUAL RCWS		40mm Grenade	Turkey	20+	Can also be equipped with a 7.62mm machine gun or 12.7mm anti-aircraft gun.
ASELSAN Alkar		120 mm NATO mortar round	Turkey	6	Installed on the BMC Vuran to make a self-propelled mortar system. (Also listed under "Artillery").

=== Portable anti-drone jammers ===
Model	Image	Caliber	Origin	Quantity	Note
Aselsan IHASAVAR			Turkey		

== Artillery ==
Model	Type	Image	Origin	Quantity	Notes
Self-propelled artillery
HUMVEE Hawkeye 105mm	Self-propelled artillery		United States	N/A	Hawkeye is a lightweight, self-propelled howitzer equipped with a 105 mm gun.
Mortars
MKEK Comando 60mm	60mm Mortar		Turkey	N/A	
MKEK NT1 81 mm	81mm Mortar		Turkey	N/A	
Havan UT-1 81 mm	81mm Mortar		Turkey	N/A	
M69 82 mm	82mm Mortar		Yugoslavia	N/A	
M75 120mm	120mm Mortar		Yugoslavia	200	
Mortar carriers
ASELSAN Alkar on the BMC Vuran 120 mm	Self-propelled mortar system		Turkey	6	Installed on the BMC Vuran to make a self-propelled mortar system. (Also listed under "Weapon station").

== Utility vehicles ==
Example of a KSF vehicle plate

Unmanned ground vehicle
	Unmanned ground vehicle STRIDAR	Kosovo	Unmanned ground vehicle	1	First local production Unmanned Ground Vehicle by Kosovar/American Company	
Picture	Name	Origin	Type	Number	Notes	Reference
	Can-Am BRP Outlander	Canada	All-terrain vehicle	—		
	Lynx Ranger 1200	Finland	Snowmobile	—		
	Volkswagen Tiguan	Germany	Light utility vehicle	—	Operated by the Military Police of KSF.	
	Ford Kuga	United States	Light utility vehicle	12+ N/A unmarked		
	Ford F-550	United States	Light utility vehicle	—		
	Mercedes-Benz G Class	Germany	Light utility vehicle	—		
	Land Rover Defender	United Kingdom	Light utility vehicle	—		
	Volkswagen T6	Germany	Utility van	—	Troop transport.	
	Mercedes-Benz Sprinter	Germany	Utility van	—	Troop transport.	
	Otokar Navigo	Turkey	Utility bus	—	Troop transport.	

== Armored vehicles and MRAPs ==
Picture	Name	Origin	Type	Number Total (334+)	Notes	Reference
	Humvee	United States	Light armored car	200+	Equipped with either 12.7mm M2A1 or40mm MK 19	Kosovo has purchased at least 51 Humvees, and USA has donated many.
	Otokar Akrep	Turkey	Light utility vehicle	3	Operated by the Military Police of KSF.	
	Otokar Cobra	Turkey	Infantry mobility vehicle	20		
	M1117 Guardian	United States	Internal security vehicle	105	Equipped with 7.62mm M240, 12.7mm M2A1 and 40mm MK 19	The KSF received 55 M1117 vehicles in 2021 and 50 more in 2025 .
	BMC Vuran	Turkey	MRAP	6	BMC Vuran (4X4) Aselsan Alkar 120 mm integrated Mortar carrier	

== Tactical logistic trucks ==
Picture	Name	Origin	Type	Number	Notes	Reference
	Daimler Truck Unimog	Germany	Military truck	—	Used as an ambulance vehicle.	
	Mercedes-Benz NG 1017A	Germany	Military truck	—	—	
	Iveco Trakker	Italy	Military truck	—	—	
	Daimler Truck Unimog U5000	Germany	Military truck	12	Daimler Truck Defence Delivers First Twelve Mercedes-Benz Unimog Vehicles to the Kosovo Security Force	
	MB Man	Germany	Military truck	15	KSF purchased 12 trucks in 2018; an additional 3 were donated by the German Embassy in 2023.	
	HX44M 8×8 (HX2)	Germany	Military truck	23	10 purchased by the KSF, 5 donated by the German government, and 8 more delivered in 2026.	
	MAN TGM	Germany	Military truck	2	In the HAZMAT configuration. Operated by the National Guard.	

== Aviation ==
Kosovo Security Force is currently in its third phase of its transition into the Kosovo Armed Forces and it is now building its air defence capabilities. It currently possesses a series of UAVs and UCAVs and is in the process of purchasing air-defence capabilities and aircraft. In January 2025, it was announced that Kosovo's minister of defence had reached an agreement with US State Department officials for the acquisition of several UH-60 Black Hawk helicopters. Kosovo currently has 3 air bases, and 15+ pilots and it is continuously training new pilots in the Albania, Turkey, and the United States.

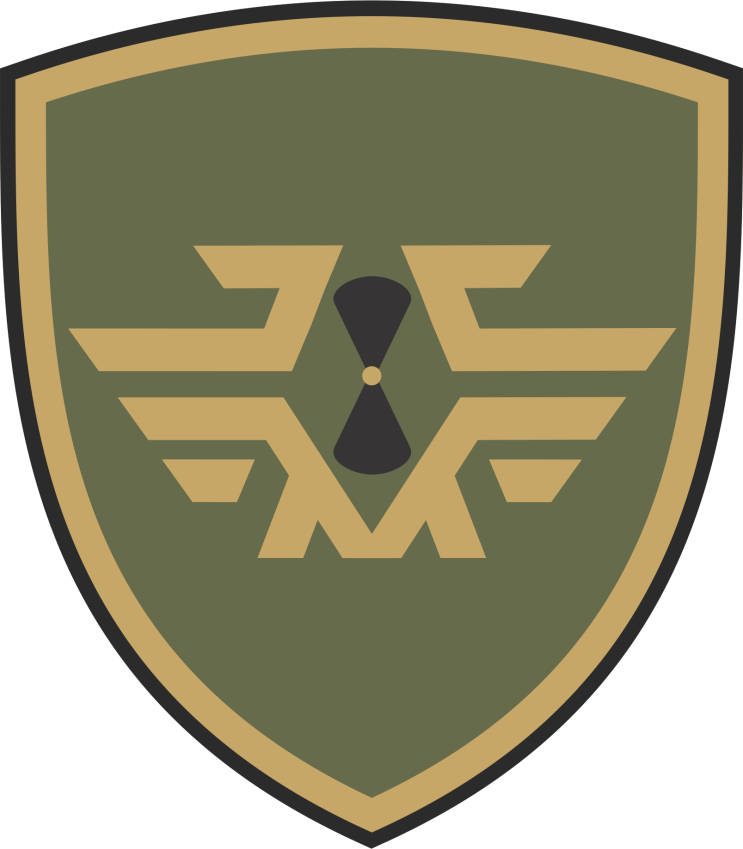
Aviation Unit Insignia

Roundel Insignia for KSF Aircraft

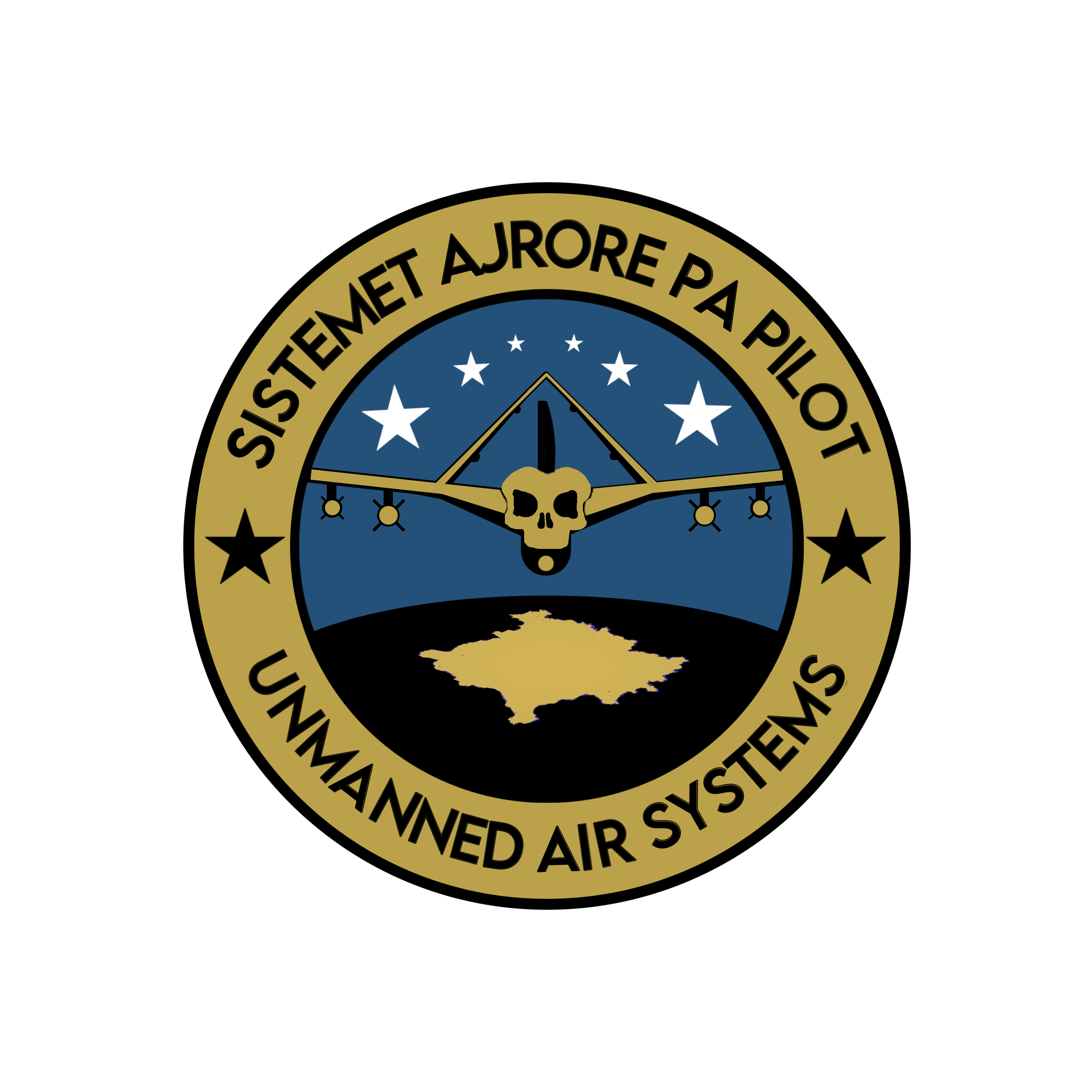
Unmanned Air Systems Insignia

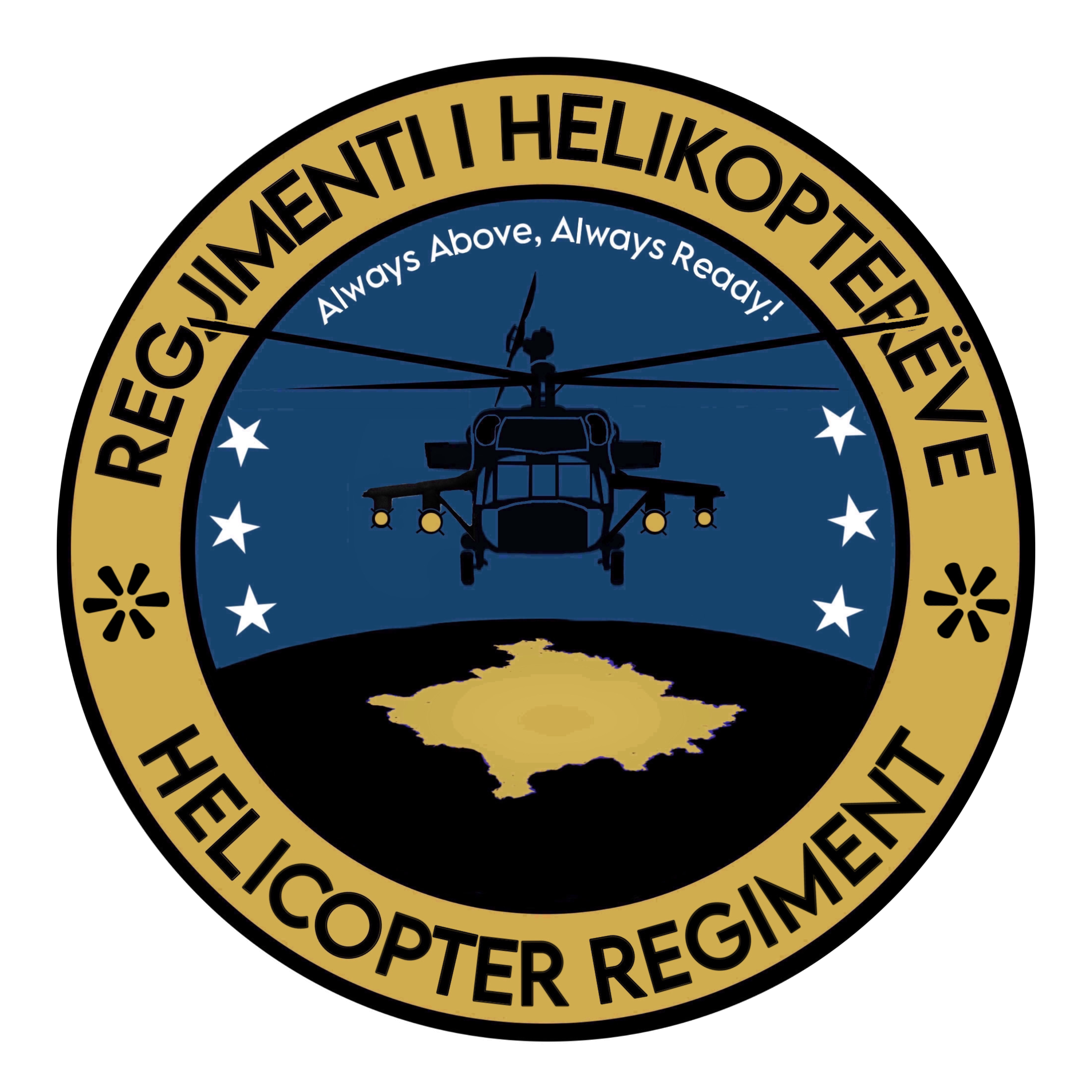
Helicopter Regiment Insignia

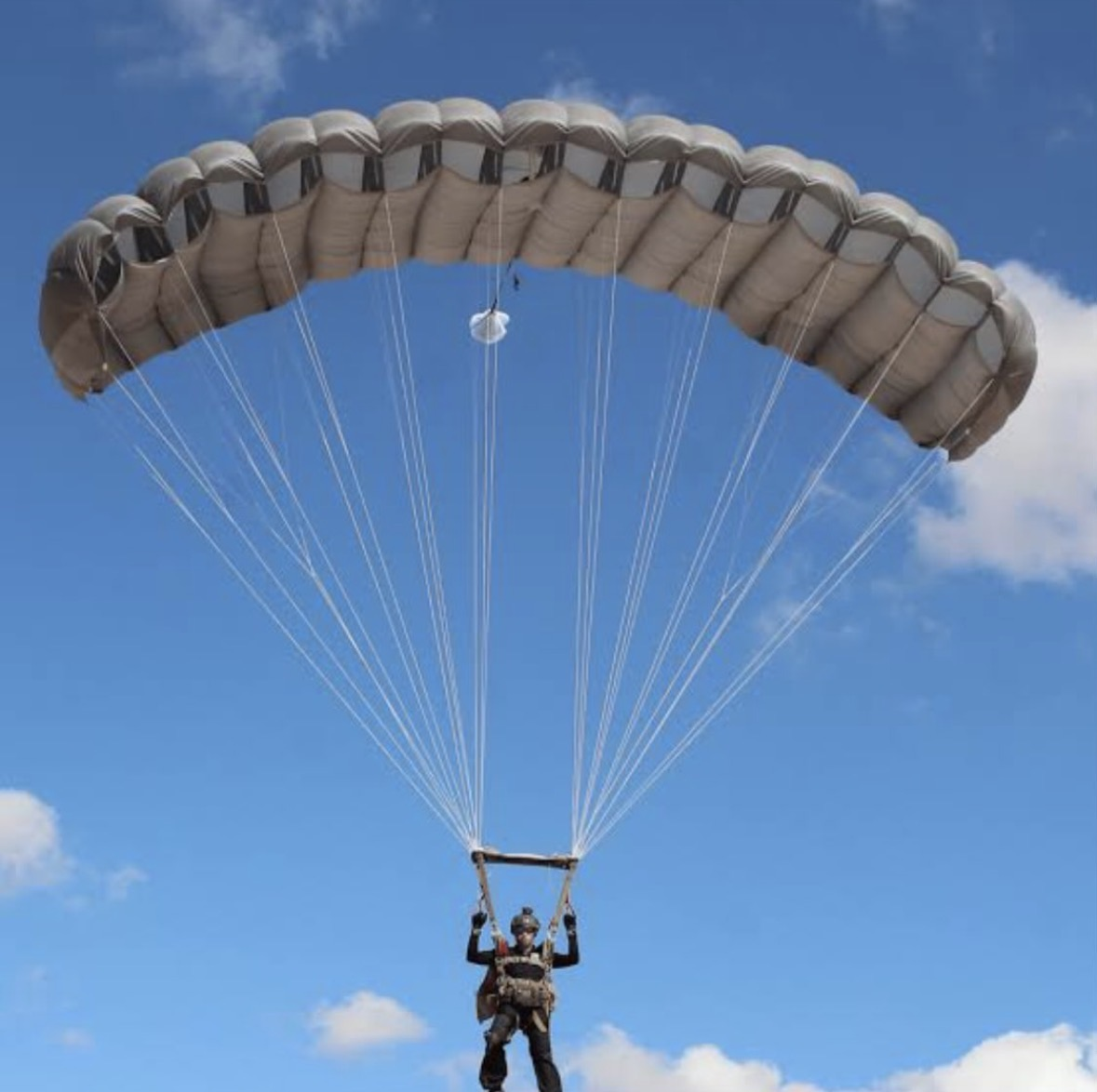
Kosovo Airborne Troops

Picture	Name	Origin	Numbers	Notes	Reference
Helicopters
	Sikorsky UH-60 Black Hawk	United States		Unknown number planned to enter service in the 2025–2028 transition period.	
Unmanned combat aerial vehicles (UCAVs)
	Bayraktar TB2	Turkey	5	Armed with Roketsan MAM-C and MAM-L.	
Reconnaissance drones
	AeroVironment RQ-20 Puma	United States	4		
FPV drones
	SkyDagger 15	Turkey	Thousands		

== Air armaments ==
Picture	Name	Origin	Numbers	Notes
	Roketsan MAM-C	Turkey		Used on Bayraktar TB2
	Roketsan MAM-L	Turkey		Used on Bayraktar TB2
