= List of equipment of the Sudanese Armed Forces =

The following is a list of equipment of the Sudanese Armed Forces from creation to present day. May be inaccurate or rounded to lesser numbers than it actually is.

== Pistols ==
Name	Image	Origin	Variants	Notes
Heckler & Koch P9S		Germany		
Helwan		Egypt		Egyptian copy of Berreta 1951
Browning Hi-Power		Belgium		

== Submachine guns ==
Name	Image	Origin	Variants	Notes
Sterling		United Kingdom		
Heckler & Koch MP5		Germany		
Beretta M12		Italy		
Uzi		Israel		

== Rifles ==
Name	Image	Origin	Variants	Notes
SKS		Soviet Union		
AKM		Soviet Union		
AK-47		Soviet Union		
Heckler & Koch G3		Germany	G3A3	

== Machine guns ==
Name	Image	Origin	Variants	Notes
RP-46		Soviet Union		
RPD		Soviet Union		
RPK		Soviet Union		
Type 80		China		Chinese copy of the PK machine gun, locally produced as the Mokthar.
Heckler & Koch HK21		Germany		
M60		United States		
MG3		Germany		
SG-43 Goryunov		Soviet Union	SGM	

== Rocket-propelled grenades ==
Name	Image	Origin	Variants	Notes
RPG-7		Soviet Union		

== Recoilless rifles ==
Name	Image	Origin	Variants	Notes
M40		United States	M40A1	

== Anti-tank guided missiles ==
Name	Image	Origin	Variants	Notes
HJ-8		China		
Saegheh			Saeghe-2	
9M133 Kornet		Russia	9K135 Kornet	
9K11 Malyutka		Soviet Union		

== Man-portable anti-aircraft missiles ==
Name	Image	Origin	Variants	Notes
9K32 Strela-2		Russia	9K32M Strela-2M	
FN-6		China		

== Tanks ==
Name	Image	Origin	Variants	In service	Notes
M41 Walker Bulldog		United States			53 received as second-hand aid from Saudi Arabia in 1981.
M47 Patton		United States			17 received as second-hand aid from Saudi Arabia in 1981.
M60		United States	M60A3		20 received in 1979.
T-34		Soviet Union	T-34-85		20 received second-hand from Egypt from 1958 to 1959.
T-54		Soviet Union			50 received second-hand from 1969 to 1970.
T-55		Soviet Union	T-55 T-55A T-55AM2 T-55AMV	Yes Yes	50 T-55s received from 1969 to 1970. 9 received second-hand from Belarus in 1991; 60 received second-hand from Ukraine in 2010 to 2011. 20 T-55AM2 received second-hand from Poland in 1999; intended for Yemen but illegally diverted to Sudan. 60 received second-hand from Belarus in 1999 and 2001.
T-72		Soviet Union	T-72AV T-72B T-72M1	Yes Yes	130 T-72M1 received second-hand from Ukraine from 2010 to 2013.
Type 59		China	Type 59 Type 59D	Yes	50 Type 59 received in 1972. 50 upgraded into Type 59D under license in Sudan from 2010 to 2015 as "Al-Zubair 2".
Type 62		China		Yes	70 received from 1971 to 1973.
Type 63		China		Yes	10 received in 1978.
Type 80/88		China	Type 85-IIM	Yes	50 received from 2002 to 2011. Possibly assembled in Sudan. In service as the "Al-Bashier".
Type 72Z		Iran			10 received in 2006. Possibly rebuilt from Sudanese T-54, T-55 or Type 59 tanks; work possibly done in Sudan Possibly in service as "Al-Zubair 1".

== Armoured vehicles ==
Armoured vehicles
Name	Image	Origin	In service	Notes
Armoured Fighting Vehicles
BRDM-2		Soviet Union / Sudan	200+ / locally assembled	
Amir		Sudan	locally assembled	local modification and heavy upgrade based on the chassis of the BRDM
Caiman		Belarus	~70	
Infantry Fighting Vehicles
Shareef-1		Sudan	locally produced	
Shareef-2		Sudan	locally produced	
Shareef-3		Sudan	locally produced	BMP-1 turret on a BTR-70
BMP-1		Soviet Union	200+	
BMP-2		Soviet Union	100+	
BTR-3		Ukraine	50+	
BTR-80A		Russia / Sudan	Undisclosed	
WZ-523		China /	150+ / locally produced	
Infantry Mobility Vehicles / Armoured Personnel Carriers
Mohafiz-V		Pakistan	100-200+	Inducted recently.
Armoured Technical (vehicle)		Sudan	Tens of thousands	
NIMR Ajban 440A		United Arab Emirates	70+	
Sarsar-2		Sudan	locally produced	
Humvee		United States	~500	
Oshkosh M-ATV		United States	~300	
Al-Wahsh		Jordan	not publicly disclosed	
STREIT Group Cougar		United Arab Emirates	not publicly disclosed	
STREIT Group Puma		United Arab Emirates	not publicly disclosed	
MSPV Panthera T6		United Arab Emirates	not publicly disclosed	
Sarsar-3		Sudan	locally produced	MSPV Panthera T6 locally produced copy
Sarsar-4		Sudan	locally produced	
SHELL LAPC		United Arab Emirates	not publicly disclosed	
INKAS Titan-S		United Arab Emirates	not publicly disclosed	
TAG Terrier LT-79		United Arab Emirates	not publicly disclosed	
VN-4		China	not publicly disclosed	
YW531A		China	~50	
BTR-50		Soviet Union	~30	
M113A3		United States	~50	
OT-62 TOPAS		Czechoslovakia	~70	
BTR-70		Soviet Union; Belarus	150+	
BTR-152		Soviet Union	10	
Cadillac Gage Commando		United States	20	
OT-64		Czechoslovakia	70+	
Rakhsh		Iran	100+	
Walid		Egypt	80+	
WZ-551		China / Sudan	200+ / locally produced	
WZ-523		China / Sudan	100+ / locally produced	
Fath Safir		Iran / Sudan	Thousands	Licence version of the Iranian jeep, assembled locally under the name « Karaba »
Mine-Resistant Ambush Protected Vehicles
STREIT Group Spartan		United Arab Emirates	not publicly disclosed	
Calidus MCAV-20		United Arab Emirates	not publicly disclosed	
STREIT Group Typhoon		United Arab Emirates	not publicly disclosed	
Federal-M		Russia	not publicly disclosed	First and only foreign operator of the rare Russian MRAP
STREIT Gladiator MRAP		United Arab Emirates	not publicly disclosed	
Chekan		Russia	not publicly disclosed	
VN-2C		China	not publicly disclosed	
Towed Artillery
155mm M777		United States	~18	
105 mm M101		United States	270+	
122 mm M-30		Soviet Union	400+	
122 mm D-30		Soviet Union / Sudan	300+	
122 mm D-74		Soviet Union	100	
130 mm M-46		Soviet Union; China	50	
155 mm M114		United States	30	
Self-Propelled Artillery
Khalifa-1		Sudan	locally produced	
Khalifa-2		Sudan	locally produced	
122 mm 2S1 Gvozdika		Soviet Union	70	
Mk F3 155 mm		France	30	
Multiple Rocket Launchers
107 mm Type-63		China / Sudan	500+ / locally produced	
122mm Taka		Sudan	locally produced	
122 mm BM-21 'Grad'		Soviet Union / Sudan	120+ / locally produced	
122 mm Sakr		Egypt	50+	
122 mm Type-81		China	70+	
302 mm WS-1B		China/Sudan	30+ / locally produced	locally produced, original Chinese units are 30, could be much more
400mm WS-2		China	not publicly disclosed	
Towed Anti-Aircraft Guns
23 mm ZU-23-2		Soviet Union	Tens of Thousands	put on the back of technicals
14.5 mm ZPU		Soviet Union	4000+	
57 mm AZP S-60		Soviet Union	200+	
37 mm M1939 (61-K)		Soviet Union	100+	
20 mm M167 VADS		United States	16	
37 mm Type-65		China	70+	
85 mm M1944 (КS-1)		Soviet Union	150+	
Self-propelled anti-aircraft guns
20 mm M163 Vulcan		United States	80	
20 mm M3 VDAA		France	20	
Self-propelled surface-to-air missile systems
9K33 Osa		Soviet Union		
HİSAR-A		Turkey	not publicly disclosed	
HİSAR-O		Turkey	not publicly disclosed	
FB-6A		China	not publicly disclosed	

== Sources ==
- Jones, Richard D.; Ness, Leland S., eds. (14 January 2010). Jane's Infantry Weapons 2010-2011 (36 ed.). Jane's Information Group. ISBN 978-0-7106-2908-1.
- International Institute for Strategic Studies (2024). "Chapter Eight: Sub-Saharan Africa". The Military Balance. 124 (1): 458–531. doi:10.1080/04597222.2024.2298597. ISSN 0459-7222.
- International Institute for Strategic Studies (2026). The Military Balance 2026. Oxfordshire: Routledge. doi:10.4324/9781003778974. ISBN 978-1-003-77897-4. ISSN 0459-7222.
- LeBrun, Emile; Leff, Jonah (6 December 2014). "Chapter 7. Signs of Supply: Weapons Tracing in Sudan and South Sudan". In McDonald, Glenn; LeBrun, Emile; Frate, Anna Alvazi del; Berman, Eric G.; Krause, Keith (eds.). Small Arms Survey 2014: Women and Guns. Geneva, Switzerland: Cambridge University Press. pp. 213–238. ISBN 978-1-107-04197-4.
- Leff, Jonah; LeBrun, Emile (May 2014). Following the Thread: Arms and Ammunition Tracing in Sudan and South Sudan (Report). HSBA Working Paper. Geneva, Switzerland: Small Arms Survey. ISBN 978-2-9700897-1-1.
