= List of equipment of the National Army of Colombia =

This is a list of equipment used by the National Army of Colombia.

== Land vehicles ==
Model	Units in service	Status	Origin	Image
Armoured vehicles
LAV III	82	In service	Canada	
EE-9 Cascavel	121	In service	Brazil	
Infantry transport vehicles
M-113A2	28 (+ up to 60 in storage)	In service	United States	
EE-11 Urutu	100	In service	Brazil	
M1117	87	In service	United States	
Humvee	800	In service	United States	
Plasan Sand Cat	22	In service	Israel	
RG-31 Nyala	4	In service	South Africa	
ISBI Meteoro	16	In service	Colombia	
Hunter TR-12	10	In production	Colombia	

== Multipurpose vehicles ==
Vehicle	Units in service	Status	Origin	Image
Multipurpouse vehicles
M35 2-1/2 ton cargo truck		In service	United States	
AIL Abir		In service	Israel	
M151 MUTT		In service	United States	
Ford Super Duty		In service	United States	

== Artillery ==
Vehicle/System	Firm number in service	Status	Origin	Image
Field artillery
BAE Land Systems/Santa Bárbara Sistemas 155/52 Howitzer	15	In service	Spain	
GIAT/Nexter LG-1 Howitzer	20	In service	France	
M101 Howitzer	75	In service	United States	

== Mortars ==
Model	Origin	Type	Image	Details
M-4 Commando Mortar	South Africa	Commando mortar		
M30 mortar	United States	106mm heavy mortar		
Mortier 120mm Rayé Tracté Modèle F1	France	120mm heavy mortar		
Nimrod	Israel	Surface-to-surface missile		
M116 howitzer	United States	Mountain gun		

== Self-propelled artillery ==
System	Units in service	Status	Origin	Image
Self-propelled artillery
Joya SAA-1	6	In service	United States; France; Colombia	

== Systems of anti-aircraft defense ==
Vehicle/System	Firm number in service	Status	Origin	Photo
Anti-aircraft defense specialized vehicles
M-8 Tow AA	20	In service	United States	
M-462 Abir Nimrod Anti-aircraft system	500	In service	Israel	
Nimrod Anti-aircraft system	40	In service	Israel	
Anti-aircraft batteries Eagle Eye	120	In service	United States; Israel	
Oerlikon dual gun system	75	In reserve	Switzerland	
Bofors M1	150	In reserve	Sweden	
M8/M-55 AAA	75	In reserve	United States; Israel; Colombia	
FIM-92 Stinger	60	In service	United States	
MBDA Mistral		In service	France	

== Weapons ==
Model	Origin	Type	Image	Details
Pistols
Córdova	Colombia	Pistol		Standard issue pistol to Colombian Army
Beretta M9	Italy; United States	Pistol		
M1911 pistol	United States	Pistol		
IWI Jericho 941	Israel	Pistol		
Assault rifles
Galil	Israel; Colombia	Assault rifle		Standard issue rifle. Produced under license by Indumil. Also adopted the Galil ACE rifle by the middle of 2010, produced by Indumil. FARC rebels use captured examples against the Colombian armed forces.
IWI Tavor	Israel	Assault rifle		The Colombian Army operates the TAR-21 for their special forces, in the army, marines and in the Colombian national police.
Galil ACE	Israel; Colombia	Assault rifle		Is the new standard-issue assault rifle of the Army, Navy (including Colombian Marine Corps), Air Force and Police of Colombia. Manufactured by an agreement between Indumil and IWI for export markets in Colombia.
M16 rifle	United States	Assault rifle		M16A2 used
M4 carbine	United States	Carbine		M4A1s as part of a 2008 Foreign Military Sales. More M4/M4A1s announced to be sold via FMS program in 2017.
Submachine guns
Uzi	Israel	Submachine gun		
Heckler & Koch MP5	West Germany	Submachine gun		Limited used by special forces
Support weapons
IWI Negev	Israel	Light machine gun		Standard Issue Light machine gun
Daewoo Precision Industries K3	South Korea	Light machine gun		400 K3s acquired in 2006.
M249 light machine gun	United States	Light machine gun		
M2 Browning Machine Gun	United States	Heavy machine gun		
M60 machine gun	United States	General-purpose machine gun		
FN MAG	Belgium	General-purpose machine gun		
M1919 Browning machine gun	United States	Medium machine gun		
Sniper rifles
Armalite AR-10	United States	Sniper rifle		
Barrett M82	United States	Anti-materiel rifle		
Barrett M95	United States	Anti-materiel rifle		
IMI Galatz	Israel	Sniper rifle		
M24 SWS	United States	Sniper rifle		
Remington MSR	United States	Sniper rifle		Used by Colombian Special Forces.
Grenade launchers
Mk 19 grenade launcher	United States	Grenade machine gun		
M79 grenade launcher	United States	Grenade launcher		
M203 grenade launcher	United States	Grenade launcher		
MGL Mk 1	South Africa; Colombia	Grenade launcher		Indumil produces the MGL Mk 1 under license.
Anti-armour
RPG-22	Russia	Rocket-propelled grenade		
Spike (missile)	Israel	Anti-tank missile Anti-ship missile		Total 300 Spike-MR/LR and 15 Spike-ER missiles. The Colombian National Army Aviation's fleet of Sikorsky UH-60 Arpia IV-series helicopters are armed with three variants of the Spike: the ER, LR and NLOS.
BGM-71 TOW	United States	Anti-tank missile		18 BGM-71 mounted on HMMWVs
APILAS	France	Anti-tank weapon		
M72 LAW	United States; Norway	Anti-tank weapon		
AT4	Sweden	Anti-tank weapon		

== Aircraft ==
Name	Origin	Type	Version(s)	In service	Notes
Fixed wing
Gulfstream Turbo Commander	United States	Transport	Commander 1000	2	
Beechcraft King Air	United States	Transport	90; 200; 350	4	
Beechcraft Super King Air	United States	Electronic warfare	200; 350	4	
Convair 580	United States	Airliner		1	
Cessna 208 Caravan	United States	Utility		5	
Aero Commander 500	United States	Utility	Rockwell 685 Commander	2	
CASA C-212 Aviocar	Spain	Transport		3	
Antonov An-32	Ukraine	Transport		2	
Helicopters
UH-1 Iroquois; UH-1N Twin Huey	United States / Canada	Utility helicopter	UH-1H; UH-1N	64	41 of the UH-1N Twin Hueys are retired Canadian Forces aircraft.
Mil Mi-17	Russia	Transport helicopter	Mi-17 MD	20	One lost on 25 February 2013 and in 2024
Sikorsky UH-60 Black Hawk	United States; Poland	Transport/Combat helicopter	UH-60L; S-70i	53; 7	Including the 15 from Plan Colombia. Two UH-60 lost on 22 February 2013 and on 5 February 2024. All S-70i helicopters used by the Special Operations Aviation Battalion.
Unmanned aerial vehicles
RQ-11 Raven	United States	Reconnaissance	RQ-11B	15	Special Forces
