= List of equipment of the Salvadoran Army =

This is a list of equipment used by the Salvadoran Army.

== Infantry weapons ==
=== Handguns ===
Model	Image	Caliber	Origin	Details
SIG Sauer P226		.40 S&W	Switzerland	All its variants including the SIG Sauer X Six SIG P226 X Six. Used by soldiers and special forces.
CZ 75		9×19mm	Czechoslovak Socialist Republic	
Jericho 941		9×19mm	Israel	
Browning Hi-Power		9×19mm	Belgium	
Glock 17		9×19mm	Austria	Salvadoran Army's Special Forces and Anti-terrorist Command. Variants that are used: Glock 17, Glock 17C, Glock 17L, Glock 17MB, Glock 17M.

=== Submachine guns and personal defence weapons ===
Model	Image	Caliber	Origin	Details
MP5		9×19mm	West Germany	MP5SD3, MP5A3, MP5A2, MP5, MP5A1
Uzi		9×19mm	Israel	Uzi submachine gun, Mini-Uzi.

=== Assault and battle rifles ===
HK33	5.56×45mm	West Germany	Including HK53 variant.
HK G3	7.62×51mm	West Germany	G3A3, G3A4, G3KA4
FN FNC	5.56×45mm	Belgium	Versions used: Standard" Model 2000 and Short" Model 7000, used by the Salvadoran Military Police and Paratrooper Battalion.
M4	5.56×45mm	United States	M4 Carbine, Colt M4A1, Colt M4 (original 1993 version), M4 (Colt Model 933), Colt M4 (M162 sights, burst and full auto)
T65	5.56×45mm	Taiwan	
CAR-15	5.56×45mm	United States	Colt Model 933, XM177, GAU-5/A (Colt Model 610), XM177E1 (Colt Model 609), XM177E2 (Colt Model 629), Colt Model 653 (M16A1 Carbine), Colt Model 654 (M16A1 Carbine), Colt Model 654 (M16A1 Carbine), Colt Model 727 (M16A2 carbine), Colt Model 733 (M16A2 Commando), Colt Model 723 "M16A2 Carbine". M16A2 SMG Model 635, XM177-E2 (Colt Model 629), Model 933, Colt Model 629, Colt 9mm SMG DOE (Model 633, US Car 15 Carbine (Colt Model 607), US XM177E1 (Colt Model 619), US XM177E2 GAU-5/A/B (Colt Model 639)).
M16	5.56×45mm	United States	XM16E1, M16A1, M16A2, M16A3, M16A4, M16A1 with A2 handguards. M16A2 (Model 701, 703, 705 (Burst fire/single fire)), Model 711, Model 715 and Model 720 (Burst fire/single fire)). M16A2 Light Machine Gun (LMG). Some M16A1s have the M16A2's brass defectors, XM16E1. M16A2 (Model 645), some M16A1s (also with the A2 handguards) have the M16A2 hand-grip. M16A1 with A2 handgrip A2 brass defectors. Also M16A1 with M16A2 handguards have M16A2 brass defectors and M16A1 handgrip, M16A1 (enhanced).
M14	7.62×51mm	United States	Used as ceremonial gun, still used in active service on the Salvadoran Army infantry divisions.
AKM	7.62×39mm	Soviet Union	Used since 1992 by the special forces.
AK-63	7.62×39mm	Hungarian People's Republic	Used since 1992.
IMI Galil	5.56×45mm	Israel	Galil AR, Galil SAR, Galil SAR339, Micro Galil, Galil ARM.
Galil ACE	5.56×45mm	Israel	

=== Sniper rifles ===
Model	Image	Caliber	Origin	Details
M21		7.62×51mm	United States	Used in the Salvadoran Army Special Forces.
M24		7.62×51mm	United States	
Barrett M82		.50 BMG	United States	Used in the Salvadoran Army Special Forces.

=== Machine guns ===
Model	Image	Caliber	Origin	Details
M60		7.62×51mm	United States	M60, M60E2, M60B, M60C M60D. During the civil war some M60s were chopped from the front sights to give a CQB capability.
M2HB		.50 BMG	United States	
HK21		7.62×51mm	West Germany	
FN MAG		7.62×51mm	Belgium	

=== Anti-armor weapons ===
Model	Image	Type	Origin	Details
Rocket-propelled grenade
M72 LAW		Anti-tank grenade launcher	United States	792
C90-CR		Anti-tank grenade launcher	Spain	
Recoilless launcher
M67		Recoilless rifle	United States	379
M40		Recoilless rifle	United States	
Grenades
M67		Hand grenade	United States	
M18		Smoke Grenade	United States	
Grenade launchers
M79		Grenade launcher	United States	
M203		Grenade launcher	United States	

== Vehicles ==
Note: Sources are circa 1988, while some equipment listed may no longer be in service.

Armoured fighting vehicles
Model	Image	Type	Number	Origin	Notes
AML 90		Armoured car	10	France	
UR-416		Wheeled armored personnel carrier	10	West Germany	
YAGU		Armoured personnel carrier	6	Israel; Mexico	All-terrain armored vehicle (ATV) for special operations, the version of the YAGU delivered to El Salvador has capacity for three people, equipped with a UAV (unmanned aerial vehicle) and offers level B6+ armor protection, that is, against rifles. high powered assault
Hurricane		Armoured personnel carrier	19	Mexico	The Hurricane can support a single 12.7 mm machine gun, or a 7.62 mm machine gun.
SandCat MX		Armoured personnel carrier	5	Israel; Mexico	The SandCat MX can support a single 12.7 mm machine gun, or a 7.62 mm machine gun.
Black Mamba (SandCat)		Armoured personnel carrier	5	Israel; Mexico	The Black Mamba (produced/developed in Mexico) can support a single 12.7 mm machine gun, or a 7.62 mm machine gun. The Black Mamba also has a clearer intention for interior security (police/public security) purposes compared to the Israeli variants it was based off of.
Cashuat		Armoured personnel carrier	41	El Salvador; United States	Based on a Dodge M37. Armour kits and turrets purchased from the United States and applied in El Salvador
VCT-A1		Infantry fighting vehicle	1	El Salvador	Armed with two 20mm HS cannons, used as an anti-aircraft vehicle, designed and produced by the Salvadoran Army.
VCT-A2		Infantry fighting vehicle	3	El Salvador	Armed with two HS 404 20mm cannons in a 360° turret and a 7.62mm M60 or FN MAG machine gun or a 12.7x99mm M2 Browning as a secondary weapon, it is used as a tank hunting vehicle, vehicle anti-aircraft and armored personnel carrier.
BC7A1		Armoured personnel carrier	4	El Salvador	Armed with two HS 404 20mm cannons. Also used as Anti-Air vehicle, created by the Salvadorian Military
M113		Armoured personnel carrier	20	United States	
CJ-8 (Scrambler)		Armoured car	Unknown	United States	
HMMWV		Light armoured car	50	United States	
BMC Vuran		Mine-resistant ambush protected	11	Turkey	
Utility vehicles
Model	Image	Type	Number	Origin	Notes
F-Series		Medium-duty commercial vehicle	Unknown	Japan	Part of a fleet of 45 new vehicles.
D22		Pick up	Unknown	Japan	Part of a fleet of 45 new vehicles.
AIL Storm		Light utility vehicle	38	Israel	
2011 Ford Ranger		Light utility vehicle	37	United States	
Jeep CJ		Light utility vehicle		United States	
M151		Light utility vehicle		United States	
M35 truck		Medium cargo truck	45	United States	
M809 truck		Heavy cargo truck		United States	
MAN 630 truck		Heavy cargo truck		West Germany	

== Artillery ==
Mortars
Model	Image	Caliber	Number	Dates	Origin	Notes
M19		60mm	306		United States	
M29		81mm	151		United States	
M74		120mm			Yugoslavia	Kept in storage.
UB M-52		120mm			Yugoslavia	Kept in storage.
Field artillery
Model	Image	Caliber	Number	Dates	Origin	Notes
M101		105mm	8		United States	
M102		105mm	24		United States	
M56		105mm	18		Yugoslavia	On reserve, only used in ceremonies.
Soltam M-71		155mm	6		Israel	
105/14 Model 56		105mm	14		Italy	Pack Howitzer
M114		155mm	6		United States	
Anti-aircraft artillery
Model	Image	Caliber	Number	Dates	Origin	Notes
Zastava M55		20mm	31		Yugoslavia	
