= List of equipment of the Comorian Army =

This is a list of the equipment used by the Comorian Army.

== Small arms ==
Name	Image	Caliber	Type	Origin	Notes
Submachine guns
MAT-49		9×19mm	Submachine gun	France	
Rifles
MAS-49/56		7.5×54mm	Semi-automatic rifle	France	
SKS		7.62×39mm	Semi-automatic rifle	Soviet Union	
AKM		7.62×39mm	Assault rifle	Soviet Union	
Type 81		7.62×39mm	Assault rifle	China	
FN FAL		7.62×51mm	Battle rifle	Belgium	
MAS-36		7.5×54mm	Bolt-action rifle	France	
Machine guns
RP-46 Type 58		7.62×54mmR	Light machine gun	Soviet Union China	
RPK		7.62×39mm	Squad automatic weapon	Soviet Union	
AA-52		7.5×54mm	General-purpose machine gun	France	
NSV «Utyos»		12.7×108mm	Heavy machine gun	Soviet Union	
Rocket propelled grenade launchers
RPG-7		40mm	Rocket-propelled grenade	Soviet Union	

== Utility vehicles ==
Name	Image	Type	Origin	Quantity	Status	Notes
Mitsubishi L200		Utility vehicle	Japan	Unknown	INS	
