= List of equipment of the Luxembourg Army =

This is a list of weapons used by the Luxembourg Army.

== Weapons ==
=== Standard small arms and heavy weapons ===
Weapon	Image	Origin	Variant	Type	Calibre	Notes
Handguns
Glock		Austria	Glock 17	Semi-automatic pistol	9×19mm Parabellum	Standard issue sidearm for the Luxembourg Army, replacing Browning Hi-Power.
Sub-machine guns
Heckler & Koch MP5		West Germany	MP5A3, MP5SD3, MP5K	Submachine gun	9×19mm Parabellum	Standard issue sub-machine gun for Luxembourg Army.
Shotgun
Benelli M3		Italy	—	Pump action shotgun	12-gauge	
Assault rifles
Heckler & Koch HK416		Germany	HK416A7 (14.5'' barrel)	Assault rifle	5.56×45mm NATO	Standard service rifle slated to replace the Steyr AUG in service from 2023.
Heckler & Koch HK416		Germany	HK416A7 (11'' barrel)	Carbine	5.56×45mm NATO	Standard service rifle slated to replace the Steyr AUG in service from 2023.
Steyr AUG		Austria	AUG A1 AUG A2	Assault rifle	5.56×45mm NATO	Standard service rifle that succeeded to the FN FAL and is being replaced by the HK416. The Steyr AUG has the UA/1116 and the KITE night sights.
Heckler & Koch HK417		Germany	HK417A2	Battle rifle	7.62×51mm NATO	Procured in 2023.
Precision rifles
Steyr AUG HBAR		Austria	AUG HBAR (S4G)	Designated marksman rifle	5.56×45mm NATO	
Machine guns
FN Minimi		Belgium	S.P.W. Special Purpose Weapon	Light machine gun	5.56×45mm NATO	Weapon used by the infantry.
M2 Browning		Belgium / United States	M2 HB	Heavy machine gun	12.7×99mm NATO (.50 BMG)	Used on remote weapon stations, or fortified positions.
Grenade launcher
Heckler & Koch HK269		Germany	—	Under barrel grenade launcher	40×46 mm LV	Procured in 2023, and compatible with the HK416.
Heckler & Koch HK69		Germany	HK69A1	Grenade launcher	40×46 mm LV	Being replaced by the HK269.
Anti-tank weapons
BGM-71 TOW		United States	—	—	152 mm	Replaced the M40 recoilless rifle. Being replaced by the Akeron MP.
Artillery
Ordnance QF 25-pounder		United Kingdom Canada	Ceremonial cannon (former field gun)	—	105 mm (transformed)	Mostly Canadian made cannons that were transformed by Cockerill into a 105 mm field gun compatible with NATO standards (the 25-pounder originally had 87.6mm (3.45 in) caliber).

== Base equipment ==
=== Camouflage ===
Model	Image	Origin	Pattern type	Environment / colours	Notes
M2011		Luxembourg	Disruptive camouflage	Temperate / central Europe	Standard camo in use in the Luxembourg army since 2010-2011.
M2011 - desert		Luxembourg	Disruptive camouflage	Arid / desert	Desert camo in use in the Luxembourg army since 2010-2011.
Multicam		United States	Disruptive camouflage	Universal	Future standard camo from 2025.

=== Protection equipment ===
Model	Image	Origin	Type	Quantity	Notes
Helmets
Ops-Core Sentry XP Mid Cut Helmet		United States	Combat helmet	—	Standard issue helmet

=== Electronic equipment ===
Model	Image	Origin	Type	Quantity	Notes
Night-vision goggles
Safran JIM Compact™		Switzerland	Multifunction IR goggles (laser range finder, laser pointer, GPS, inclinometers)	—	

== Vehicles ==
Name	Image	Origin	Type	In service	Notes
Armoured vehicles
ATF Dingo 2 Protected Reconnaissance Vehicles		Germany	Infantry mobility vehicle / MRAP	48	Procured in 2010. New camouflage in 2023 for Romanian NATO mission. Will be replaced by 2028 by 80 Eagle V "Command, Liaison and Reconnaissance Vehicles".
ATF Dingo 2		Germany	Specialised variants	15	To remain in service: 1 ambulance; 2 SatCom connection vehicles; 2 recovery vehicles; 4 command vehicles; 6 light transport vehicles
Mowag Eagle V 4×4 - CLRV "Command, Liaison and Reconnaissance Vehicle"		Switzerland	Infantry mobility vehicle, MRAP	2 / 80	Order in September 2022 by the NSPA for the Luxembourg Army, delivery from December 2024 to July 2026, replacement of the Humvee and the ATF Dingo. The acquisition cost was €226.6 million. Equipment common to French and Belgian VBMR Griffon: RWS deFNder Medium from FN Herstal equipped with M2 Browning; Information and combat system Scorpion (SICS from ATOS); CONTACT radio system SDR from Thales; anti-IED jammer BARAGE from Thales Belgium; First delivery in September 2024.
Eagle V 6×6 - PAV2 "Protected Ambulance Vehicle"		Switzerland	Armored Ambulance	1 / 4	Order in 2021. First in trial in 2025.
Humvee		United States	Armoured fighting vehicle	42	42 M1114 up-armoured entered service between 1995 and 2000. Will be replaced by 2028 by 80 Eagle V "Command, Liaison and Reconnaissance Vehicles".
Utility vehicles
Humvee		United States	Light armoured utility vehicle	N/A	Purchases: 100 purchased, most retired after the introduction of the ATF Dingo 2, except for the M997 PC, the M997 maxi-ambulance; Donations: 20 were donated to Lithuania in 2013; 28 were supplied to Ukraine in November 2022
Volkswagen Amarok		Germany	Utility vehicle (pickup with double-cab)	20	Received in 2023, replacing the Jeep Wrangler and Mitsubishi Pajero. Pickup with double-cab
Volkswagen Amarok - Tamlans		Finland Germany	Ambulance	3	Tactical ambulance with single cab.
Logistics
MAN X40		Germany	Light truck / Transport hauler	N/A	MAN X40 4×4 & 6×6
Scania G 480 8×8 MLST "Multi-purpose Logistic Support Trucks"		Sweden	Heavy military truck	28	Ordered in 2010, 31 Scania G 480 8×8 MLST. 28 transport trucks, some carry containers, some with flat racks with hooks (10 of which with mine and ballistic protection, STANAG level 3)
Recovery
EMPL EH/W 200 Bison on Scania G 480 8×8		Austria Sweden	Heavy wrecker	3	Ordered in 2010, 3 recovery trucks (with mine and ballistic protection, STANAG level 3)
EMPL EH/W 200 Bison on Scania S 660 8×8	—	Austria Sweden	Heavy wrecker	1	Purchased in 2024, equipped with: 1 "main" winch TR 200/7 on telescopic main arm and 2 spare wheels; 1 "self-recovery" winch 8-ton

== UAVs ==
Model	Image	Origin	Type	Role	Quantity	Notes
RQ-21 Integrator X-300		United States	Fixed-wing UAV Unmanned aerial vehicle	ISR Intelligence, surveillance, and reconnaissance	2	

== Future equipment ==
=== Equipment ordered ===
Model	Image	Origin	Type	Quantity ordered	Notes
Weapons
Akeron MP		France	Anti-tank guided missile	90	Missiles ordered in 2022, with deliveries to start before 2025.
Vehicles
EBRC Jaguar		France	Fire support vehicle	38	Planned for delivery from 2028, budget €1.93 billion. The Luxembourg parliament approved the purchase in November 2024. Contract signed in December 2025. Equipment common to French and Belgian VBMR Griffon and to the Luxembourg Mowag Eagle V on order: RWS deFNder Medium from FN Herstal equipped with M2 Browning; Information and combat system Scorpion (SICS from ATOS); CONTACT radio system SDR from Thales; anti-IED jammer BARAGE from Thales Belgium; In details, the expected use of the vehicles is: VBMR Griffon: 4 command vehicles for the headquarters (état-major); 4 command vehicles (2 per multinational squadron); 2 JTAC (artillery observer); 1 for sharpshooters; 5 for maintenance and supply roles; VBMR-L Serval: 2 command vehicles for the headquarters (état-major); 2 APC for the squadrons; 1 for training (driving, turret, communication systems)
VBMR Griffon		France	Multi-role armoured vehicles	16	
VBMR-L Serval		France	Armoured personnel carrier	5	
Other equipment
Field hospital	—	—	Field hospital	1	
Air defence
NASAMS-3		Norway United States	Short to medium-range air defence	1 battery	

=== Planned orders ===
Model	Image	Origin	Type	Quantity to be ordered	Notes
Recovery vehicles
Recovery vehicle	—	—	Recovery of combat vehicles	2	Type Boxer / Piranha 8×8 with RCWS
Armoured tow trucks	—	—	Armoured wrecker	3	
Logistics
Transport truck	—	—	Transport truck	50	All-terrain capacity, armoured and not armoured variants, capable to transport 20' ISO container
Heavy tractor unit with heavy semi-trailer	—	—	Tank transporter	24	Civilian truck and trailer. The trailer has to be able to be extended (length and width), loading winch, 40 tons capacity, total 80 tons.
Rail transport
Low-loader multi-purpose vehicle	—	—	Low-bed rail wagon	48	Rail wagons planned to transport the Griffon, Jaguar and Serval.

== Former equipment ==
Extended content

=== Former small arms and heavy weapons ===
==== Pistols ====
- Browning Hi-Power
- M1911 pistol
- Webley Revolver

==== Sub-machine guns ====
- Sten 9×19 Parabellum
- Thompson submachine gun .45 ACP
- Sola submachine gun 9×19 Parabellum
- Uzi 9×19 Parabellum
- FN P90 FN 5.7×28mm NATO

==== Rifles ====
- M1924 and M1930
- Karabiner 98k 7.92x57mm IS
- Ross rifle .303 British
- Pattern 1914 Enfield .303 British
- Lee–Enfield .303 British
- FN Model 1949 .30–06 Springfield
- FN FAL 7.62×51 NATO

==== Machine guns ====
- Bren light machine gun .303 British
- FN BAR .30-06 Springfield
- Vickers machine gun .303 British
- M1919 Browning machine gun .30-06 Springfield
- M60 machine gun 7.62×51mm NATO
- FN MAG 7.62×51mm NATO

==== Anti-tank weapons ====
- NLAW; 100 units total, ordered in 2010 (50) and 2015 (50), and delivered in 2012 and 2016–2017. All 100 donated to Ukraine
- Boys anti-tank rifle .55 Boys
- PIAT
- Bazooka
- M18 recoilless rifle
- M20 recoilless rifle
- M40 recoilless rifle

==== Mortars ====
- Two-inch mortar
- Ordnance ML 3 inch Mortar
- M19 mortar
- M1 mortar
- M2 4.2-inch mortar
- L16 81mm mortar

=== Vehicles ===
- Humvee: M966, M997, M998, M1035 (28 donated to Ukraine in 2022, 20 donated to Lithuania in 2013, some retired)
- Mercedes-Benz G-Class MB 300D 4×4 (W460)
- Jeep Wrangler (replaced by VW Amarok in 2021, 7 supplied to Ukraine in 2022)
- Mitsubishi Pajero (replaced by VW Amarok in 2021)
