= List of equipment of the Djiboutian Army =

This is a list of the equipment used by the Djiboutian Army.

== Small arms ==
Name	Image	Caliber	Type	Origin	Notes
Pistols
MAB PA-15		9×19mm	Semi-automatic pistol	France	Standard service pistol.
Submachine guns
MAT-49		9×19mm	Submachine gun	French Fourth Republic	
Rifles
AKM		7.62×39mm	Assault rifle	Soviet Union	
Type 56		7.62×39mm	Assault rifle	China	
FAMAS		5.56×45mm	Bullpup; Assault rifle	France	
Steyr AUG		5.56×45mm	Bullpup; Assault rifle	Austria	
M16		5.56×45mm	Assault rifle	United States	
FN FAL		7.62×51mm	Battle rifle	Belgium	
Heckler & Koch G3		7.62×51mm	Battle rifle	West Germany	
CETME Model C		7.62×51mm	Battle rifle	Francoist Spain	
SIG SG 540		7.62×51mm	Battle rifle	Switzerland	
MAS-36		7.5×54mm	Bolt-action rifle	French Fourth Republic	
Machine guns
RPD		7.62×39mm	Squad automatic weapon	Soviet Union	
RPK		7.62×39mm	Squad automatic weapon	Soviet Union	
Type 77 heavy machine gun		12.7×108mm	Heavy machine gun	China	
NSV «Utyos»		12.7×108mm	Heavy machine gun	Soviet Union	
FM 24/29		7.5×54mm	Light machine gun	French Fourth Republic	
FN MAG		7.62×51mm	General-purpose machine gun	Belgium	
AA-52		7.62×51mm	General-purpose machine gun	French Fourth Republic	
Browning M2		.50 BMG	Heavy machine gun	United States	
Rocket propelled grenade launchers
RPG-7		40mm	Rocket-propelled grenade	Soviet Union	
LRAC F1		89mm	Shoulder-launched missile weapon	France	
Grenade launchers
Mk 19		40×53mm	Automatic grenade launcher	United States	

== Anti-tank weapons ==
Name	Image	Type	Origin	Caliber	Notes
M40A1		Recoilless rifle	United States	106mm	16 in service.
APILAS		Anti-tank weapon	France		

== Anti-aircraft weapons ==
Name	Image	Type	Origin	Quantity	Status	Notes
Bofors L/70		Autocannon	Sweden	5		
ZU-23-2		Anti-aircraft gun	Soviet Union	5		
20 mm modèle F2 gun		Autocannon	France	5		Used for air defence.

== Artillery ==
Name	Image	Type	Origin	Quantity	Status	Notes
Self-propelled artillery
M109L		Self-propelled artillery	United States; Italy	10		Gift of Italian Government
Rocket artillery
Type 63		Multiple rocket launcher	China	2		
Field artillery
D-30		Howitzer	Soviet Union	9		
Mortars
MO-120-RT-61		Towed mortar	France	20		

== Tank destroyers ==
Name	Image	Type	Origin	Quantity	Status	Notes
WMA-301		Tank destroyer	China	9+		

== Infantry fighting vehicles ==
Name	Image	Type	Origin	Quantity	Status	Notes
Ratel IFV		Infantry fighting vehicle	South Africa	20		

== Scout cars ==
Name	Image	Type	Origin	Quantity	Status	Notes
BRDM-2		Amphibious armored scout car	Soviet Union	2		
Panhard VBL		Scout car	France	15		

== Armored personnel carriers ==
Name	Image	Type	Origin	Quantity	Status	Notes
BTR-60		Armoured personnel carrier	Soviet Union	12		BTR-60PB
BTR-80		Armoured personnel carrier	Soviet Union	8	INS	
AT105 Saxon		Armoured personnel carrier	United Kingdom	60		
OTO-Melara Puma		Armoured personnel carrier	Italy	14		
RG-33		Infantry mobility vehicle	South Africa; United Kingdom	10		
Patria Pasi		Armoured Personnel Carrier		1		

== Mine-Resistant Ambush Protected ==
Name	Image	Type	Origin	Quantity	Status	Notes
Casspir		MRAP	South Africa; South Africa	3		Casspir; Casspir III
Cougar		MRAP	United States	12		

== Utility vehicles ==
Name	Image	Type	Origin	Quantity	Status	Notes
Humvee		Light utility vehicle	United States	68		
Land Rover Defender		Utility vehicle	United Kingdom	13		
Mercedes-Benz G-Class		Utility vehicle	Austria; West Germany	4		
Toyota Land Cruiser		Utility vehicle	Japan	26		
Trucks
Ural-4320		Utility truck	Soviet Union	3		
Mercedes-Benz Unimog		Utility truck	Germany	4		
M35		Utility truck	United States	10		

== Reconnaissance ==
Name	Image	Type	Origin	Quantity	Status	Notes
Panhard AML		Armored car	France	20		4 AML-60 and 17 AML-90
ACMAT VLRA		Liaison Vehicle	France	4		
