= List of equipment of the Turkmen Ground Forces =

This is a list of equipment used by the Turkmen Ground Forces.

== Light weapons ==
| Photo | Model | Type | Caliber | Origin | Notes |
Infantry small arms
| | Makarov PM | Semi-automatic pistol | 9×18mm Makarov | Soviet Union | |
| | Beretta Px4 Storm | Semi-automatic pistol | 9×19mm Parabellum | Italy | |
| | K6-92 | Submachine gun | 9×18mm Makarov | Armenia | |
| | AK-47 | Assault rifle | 7.62×39mm | Soviet Union | |
| | AKM; AKMS | Assault rifle | 7.62×39mm | Soviet Union | |
| | AK-74; AKS-74 | Assault rifle | 5.45×39mm | Soviet Union | Standard issue but being replaced by the Beretta ARX160 |
| | Beretta ARX160 | Assault rifle | 5.56×45mm NATO | Italy | Standard issue Replacement of the AK-74 |
| | Dragunov SVD | Designated marksman rifle | 7.62×54mmR | Soviet Union | |
| | RPK; RPK-74 | Light machine gun | 7.62×39mm 5.45×39 | Soviet Union | |
| | PK | Light machine gun | 7.62×54mmR | Soviet Union | |
| | NSV | Heavy machine gun | 12.7x108mm | Soviet Union; Russia | |
| | DShK | Heavy machine gun | 12.7x108mm | Soviet Union; Russia | |
| | Kord | Heavy machine gun | 12.7x108mm | Soviet Union; Russia | |
Anti-tank weaponry
| | RPG-7 | Anti-tank grenade launcher | 40mm | Soviet Union | |
| | RPG-18 | Rocket propelled grenade | 64mm | Soviet Union | |
| | RPG-22 | Rocket propelled grenade | 73mm | Soviet Union | |
| | SPG-9 | Recoilless rifle | 73mm | Soviet Union | |
| | 9M14 Malyutka | Manual command to line of sight guided missile | 125mm | Soviet Union | |
| | 9K111 Fagot | Semi-automatic command to line of sight guided missile | 120mm | Soviet Union | |
| | 9M113 Konkurs | Semi-automatic command to line of sight guided missile | 135mm | Soviet Union | |
| | 9K115 Metis | Semi-automatic command to line of sight guided missile | 94mm | Soviet Union; Russia | |

== Combat vehicles ==
| Photo | Model | Type | Origin | Number | Notes |
Tanks
| | T-90S | Main battle tank | Soviet Union; Russian Federation | 4 | |
| | T-72UMG | Main battle tank | Soviet Union; Ukraine | 650 | |
Armoured reconnaissance vehicles
| | BRDM-2 | Reconnaissance vehicle | Soviet Union | 200 | |
| | BRM-1 | Reconnaissance vehicle | Soviet Union | 60 | |
| | Nimr Ajban | Reconnaissance vehicle | United Arab Emirates | N/A | |
Infantry fighting vehicles
| | BMP-1; BMP-1M BMP-1UM | Infantry fighting vehicle | Soviet Union; Ukraine | 604 | |
| | BMP-2 BMP-2D | Infantry fighting vehicle | Soviet Union | 434 | |
| | BMP-3 | Infantry fighting vehicle | Soviet Union; Russian Federation | 4 | |
| | BMD-1 | Airborne infantry fighting vehicle | Soviet Union | 8 | |
| | BTR-80A BTR-80 Grom | Amphibious infantry fighting vehicle | Soviet Union | 8 | |
Armored personnel carriers
| | Lazar 3 | Armoured personnel carrier | Serbia | 24 | About 24 vehicles ordered. Deliveries have started in 2021. |
| | BTR-60 | Armored personnel carrier | Soviet Union | 120 | Different versions in service. |
| | BTR-70 | Armored personnel carrier | Soviet Union | 300 | |
| | BTR-80 | Armored personnel carrier | Soviet Union; Russia | 450 | |
| | Bars | Armored personnel carrier | Belarus | Unknown | |
Protected patrol vehicles
| | BMC Kirpi | MRAP | Turkey | 28+ | |
| | Kamaz Typhoon | Light tactical vehicle | Russia | Unknown | Seen during parade. |
| | Titan-DS | Infantry mobility vehicle | Canada | 9+ | |
Armoured utility vehicles
| | Otokar Cobra | Infantry mobility vehicle | Turkey | 4+ | |
| | Nimr Ajban 440A | Infantry mobility vehicle | United Arab Emirates | 8 | |
Anti-tank vehicles
| | 9P122 | Anti-tank guided missile carrier | Soviet Union | 8 | Armed with Malyutka-M missile. |
| | 9P133 | Anti-tank guided missile carrier | Soviet Union | 8 | Armed with 9M14 Malyutka missile. |
| | 9P148 | Anti-tank guided missile carrier | Soviet Union | 2 | Armed with 9M113 Konkurs missile. |
| | 9P149 | Anti-tank guided missile carrier | Soviet Union | 36 | Armed with 9K114 Shturm missile. |
| | Karkal | Anti-tank guided missile carrier | Belarus; Ukraine | 4+ | Armed with Baryer missile. |

== Artillery ==
| Photo | Model | Type | Origin | Number | Notes |
Ballistic missiles
| | 9K72 Elbrus | Short-range ballistic missile | Soviet Union | 16 | |
Rocket artillery
| | BM-21 Grad BM-21A; 9P138 | 122mm multiple rocket launcher | Soviet Union; Belarus | 92 | Range: 20–45 km |
| | RM-70 | 122mm multiple rocket launcher | Czechoslovakia / Czech Republic | 6 | Range: 20 km |
| | BM-27 Uragan | 220mm multiple rocket launcher | Soviet Union | 60 | Range: 35–50 km |
| | BM-30 Smerch | 300mm multiple rocket launcher | Soviet Union / Russia | 6 | Range: 90 km |
Self-propelled artillery
| | 2S3 Akatsiya | 152 mm self-propelled howitzer | Soviet Union | 16 | Uncertain status as 2024 |
| | 2S1 Gvozdika | 122 mm self-propelled howitzer | Soviet Union | 40 | |
| | 2S9 Nona | 120 mm self-propelled mortar | Soviet Union | 17 | |
Towed artillery
| | D-30 | 122 mm howitzer | Soviet Union | 350 | |
| | M-46 | 130mm field gun | Soviet Union | 6 | |
| | D-1 | 152 mm howitzer | Soviet Union | 17 | |
| | D-20 | 152 mm howitzer | Soviet Union | 72 | |
| | 2A36 Giatsint-B | 152 mm howitzer | Soviet Union | 6 | |
| | 2A65 Msta-B | 152 mm howitzer | Soviet Union | 6 | |
| | M1938 | 120 mm mortar | Soviet Union | 66 | |
| | 2B14 Podnos | 82 mm mortar | Soviet Union | 31 | |

== Army air defence ==
| Photo | Model | Type | Number | Origin | Notes |
Man-portable air-defense systems
| | 9K32 Strela-2 | Man-portable air-defense system | Unknown | Soviet Union | |
| | 9K34 Strela-3 | Man-portable air-defense system | Unknown | Soviet Union | |
| | 9K38 Igla | Man-portable air-defense system | Unknown | Soviet Union; Russia | |
Self-propelled surface-to-air missiles
| | 9K35 Strela-10 | Mobile surface-to-air missile | 13 | Soviet Union | |
| | 9K33 Osa | Mobile surface-to-air missile | 40 | Soviet Union | |
| | 2K12 Kub | Mobile surface-to-air missile | 4 | Soviet Union | |
| | FM-90 | Mobile surface-to-air missile | Unknown | China | |
| | Akash | Mobile surface-to-air missile | Unknown | India | |
Anti-air guns
| | ZSU-23-4 Shilka | Self-propelled anti-air gun | 48 | Soviet Union | |
| | AZP S-60 | Anti-air gun | 22 | Soviet Union | |
| | ZU-23-2 | Anti-air gun | Unknown | Soviet Union | |

== Drones ==
The following section comprises a full accounting of Turkmen unmanned aerial vehicles
| Name | Origin | Photo | In service | Notes |
Surveillance unmanned aerial vehicles
| Aeronautics Defense Orbiter 2B | Israel | | N/A | |
| Elbit Skylark | Israel | | N/A | Used in conjunction with a ground-based rapid mine laying system. |
| Selex ES Falco XN | Italy | | N/A | In service since 2011. |
| Busel M ''Asuda Asman (Calm Sky)'' | Belarus; Turkmenistan | | N/A | In service since 2015. |
| Busel M40 ''Asuda Asman (Calm Sky)'' | Belarus; Turkmenistan | | N/A | License-produced in Turkmenistan. |
| Boeing Insitu ScanEagle 2 | United States | | N/A | In service since 2022. |
| ZALA 421-04М | Russian Federation | | N/A | In service since 2009. Documented by a few sources, not yet seen. |
Unmanned combat aerial vehicles
| CASC Rainbow CH-3A | People's Republic of China | | N/A | In service since 2011 (armed with AR-1 [10 km range] air-to-ground missiles). |
| WJ-600A/D | People's Republic of China | | N/A | In service since 2016 (armed with CM-502 kg [20 km+ range] air-to-ground missiles). |
| Bayraktar TB2 | Turkey | | N/A | In service since 2021 (armed with MAM-C and MAM-L [15+km range] precision-guided munitions). |
| Busel MB2 | Belarus / Turkmenistan | | N/A | Armed with F1 grenades and PTAB-2.5 and PFAB-05 small bombs. License-produced in Turkmenistan. |
Loitering munitions
| SkyStriker | Israel | | N/A | In service since 2021. |
| Busel MB1 | Belarus | | N/A | Documented by a few sources, not yet seen. |
Vertical take-off and landing unmanned aerial vehicles
| DJI Phantom 4 | China | | N/A | |
| MD4-1000 | Germany | | N/A | |
Target drones
| La-17 | Soviet Union | | | In service since 1991. Believed to have been decommissioned. |
| ASN-9 ''Ba-9'' | China | | | In service since 2016. |
| S300 | China | | | In service since 2016. |
