= Iris =

Iris most often refers to:

- Iris (anatomy), part of the eye
- Iris (color), an ambiguous color term
- Iris (mythology), a Greek goddess
- Iris (plant), a genus of flowering plants
- Iris (given name), a feminine given name, and a list of people with the name

Iris or IRIS may also refer to:

== Arts and media ==
=== Fictional entities ===
- Iris (American Horror Story), an American Horror Story: Hotel character
- Iris (Fire Force), a character in the manga series Fire Force
- Iris (Mega Man), a Mega Man X4 character
  - Iris, a Mega Man Battle Network character
- Iris (Pokémon)
  - Iris (Pokémon anime)
- Sorceress Iris, a Magicians of Xanth character
- Iris, a kaiju character in Gamera 3: Revenge of Iris
- Iris, a LoliRock character
- Iris, a Lufia II: Rise of the Sinistrals (1995) character
- Iris, a Phoenix Wright: Ace Attorney – Trials and Tribulations character
- Iris, a Ruby Gloom character
- Iris, a Taxi Driver (1976) character
- The Iris, the antagonist in Gemini Home Entertainment web series
- Iris Buenavidez-de Vera, a Lavender Fields character
- Iris Donnelly Garrison, a fictional character in the American soap opera Love is a Many Splendored Thing
- Iris Irine, a Ragnarok character
- Iris Pike, an Afraid (2024) character
- Iris Sagan, in AI: The Somnium Files
- Iris West, a DC Comics character

=== Film, television, and theatre ===
==== Film ====
- Iris shot, a film technique for ending a scene
- Iris (1916 film), a British silent romance
- Iris (1984 film), a New Zealand film
- Iris (1987 film), a Dutch film
- Iris (2001 film), a biopic about Iris Murdoch
- Iris (2014 film), a documentary about Iris Apfel by Albert Maysles
- Iris (2016 film), a French film directed by Jalil Lespert
- Iris: The Movie, a 2010 South Korean spy action film version of the 2009 television series
- IRIS: A Space Opera by Justice, 2019, produced by French band Justice

==== Stage productions ====
- Iris (Cirque du Soleil), a resident show in Los Angeles, California
- Iris (play), 1901, by the British writer Arthur Wing Pinero

==== Television ====
- Iris (TV channel), an Italian free entertainment television channel
- Iris (South Korean TV series), a 2009 South Korean espionage television series
- Iris, the original name of the British thriller television series The Iris Affair
- Iris, The Happy Professor, a 1992 Canadian television show featuring a purple ibis

=== Music ===
==== Classical compositions ====
- Iris (opera), by Pietro Mascagni
- "Iris", a chanson by Michel Lambert (1610–1696)
- "Iris", a chanson by Jean-Benjamin de La Borde (1734–1794)
- Iris, a concerto by Archibald Joyce (1873–1963)
- Iris, a piece for saxophone by Tansy Davies (born 1973)

==== Performers ====
- Iris (American band), a synthpop group
- Iris (Romanian band), a hard rock group
- Iris (Japanese group), a Japanese girl idol group
- Arc Iris, a folk pop band from Providence, Rhode Island, US

==== Albums ====
- Iris (album), by the Romanian band Iris
- Iris (EP), 1992, by Miranda Sex Garden
- Iris, 2021, by Reb Fountain

==== Songs ====
- "Iris" (song) (1998), by the Goo Goo Dolls on the soundtrack City of Angels, later covered by other artists
- "Iris", by Miles Davis on the 1965 album ESP
- "Iris", by Emmy the Great on Virtue
- "Iris", by Live on Throwing Copper
- "Iris", by Mike Posner on At Night, Alone
- "Iris", by Split Enz on Waiata
- "Iris", by The Breeders on Pod
- "Iris (Hold Me Close)", by U2 on Songs of Innocence

=== Periodicals ===
- El Iris, a Mexican periodical published in 1826
- Sheffield Iris, an early English newspaper
- IRIS Magazine, an Irish republican magazine

=== Other media ===
- Iris (game), a Halo 3 online promotion
- Irises (painting), by Vincent Van Gogh
- Iris, Messenger of the Gods, a sculpture by Auguste Rodin

== Organizations ==
=== Charitable organizations ===
- IRIS (radio reading service), provided by Vision Australia Radio
- Iris Fund for Prevention of Blindness, a British charity, now part of Fight for Sight
- International Resources for the Improvement of Sight, a multi-national charity

=== Research groups ===
- IRIS Consortium, a seismology research project
- IRIS Research, an Australian economic, community and industry research organisation
- Information Systems Research in Scandinavia, a non-profit organization in Scandinavia
- Institute for Rare Isotope Science, an organization which operates the Rare isotope Accelerator complex for ON-line experiment (RAON) in South Korea
- Institute for Research in Information and Scholarship, a Brown University program

=== Other organizations ===
- IRIS², EU satellite project
- Iris Associates, an American software company, developer of Lotus Notes
- Iris Capital, a venture capital firm primarily active in Europe
- Iris Angola Association, an LGBTQ+ NGO
- Iris Clert Gallery, a former art gallery in Paris
- Iris Ohyama, a Japanese manufacturing company
- Denso Iris, a basketball team based in Kariya, Aichi

== People ==
- Iris (artist) (born 1983), comics artist in Quebec, Canada
- Íris (footballer) (born 1945), Brazilian footballer
- Iris (singer) (born 1995), Belgian singer
- Donnie Iris (born 1943), American rock musician

== Places ==
=== United States ===
- Iris, West Virginia, a community in the US
- Iris Avenue Transit Center, on the San Diego Trolley
- Iris Falls, a waterfall in Wyoming

=== Elsewhere ===
- Iris, Cluj-Napoca, a district in Romania
- Iris, Prince Edward Island, a community in Canada
- Irıs, Tatarstan, a place in Russia
- Iris Bay, in South Georgia, British Overseas Territory
- Iris Bay (Dubai), a tower in the United Arab Emirates
- Glen Iris (disambiguation), several places
- River Iris, now Yeşilırmak River, a river in northern Turkey, called Iris in classical Greek
- IRIS Mist, a tower to be built in Dubai Maritime City, United Arab Emirates

== Science and technology ==
=== Astronomy and spaceflight ===
- IRIS (astronomical software), an image processing application
- Iris (transponder), designed for use in cubesats
- 7 Iris, an asteroid
- Infrared interferometer spectrometer and radiometer, an instrument used in the Voyager space program
- Interface Region Imaging Spectrograph, a space probe to observe the Sun
- Iris Nebula, a reflection nebula and Caldwell object in the constellation Cepheus
- International Radiation Investigation Satellite, an early satellite to study radiation in space
- Internet Routing in Space, a space-capable IP router

=== Biology and medicine ===
- Iris (anatomy), part of the eye
- Iris (insect), a genus of praying mantis
- Iris (plant), a genus of flowering plants
- Iris (psychedelic), a drug
- Iris glossy-starling, the emerald starling (Lamprotornis iris)
- Immune reconstitution inflammatory syndrome, a complication of HIV treatment

=== Computing ===
==== Computing hardware ====
- IRIS (biosensor), an interferometric high-throughput biosensor
- Iris 50 and Iris 80, mainframe computers from Compagnie Internationale pour l’Informatique
- Iris Mote, a wireless sensor node
- Iris printer, an inkjet printer
- SGI IRIS, a line of computer terminals and workstations
- HTC Iris, a smartphone manufactured by High Tech Computer Corporation
- Intel HD, UHD and Iris Graphics, a series of integrated graphics processors
- Internet Routing in Space, a space-capable IP router

==== Software ====
- IRIS (astronomical software), an image processing application
- Iris Associates, an American software company, developer of Lotus Notes
- Iris Browser, a web browser
- IRIS GL, a graphics application programming interface
- Iris (logic), a higher-order concurrent separation logic framework
- IRIS (transportation software), a traffic management system
- IRIS WorkSpace, a graphically organized iconic desktop environment
- Incident Resource Inventory System (IRIS), a distributed software tool provided by the Federal Emergency Management Agency (FEMA)

==== Other uses in computing ====
- Iris Challenge Evaluation, a series of NIST events to promote iris recognition technology
- Iris Recognition Immigration System, an electronic border control system
- Information Systems Research in Scandinavia, a non-profit organization in Scandinavia
- Insurance Regulatory Information System, a database of insurance companies in the US
- Iris flower data set, a standard example data set for use in statistics (and related software)

=== Other uses in science and technology ===
- Iris (diaphragm), a mechanical device in optical systems
- Tropical Storm Iris (disambiguation), three tropical cyclones in the Atlantic Ocean
- IRIS (jamming device), an Estonian weapon
- IRIS Consortium, a seismology research project
- Institute for Research in Information and Scholarship, a Brown University program
- Internal rotary inspection system, a pipe testing method
- International Reactor Innovative and Secure, a nuclear reactor design
- IRIS (French: Îlots regroupés pour l'information statistique), aggregated units for statistical information in French census mapping

== Transportation ==
=== Aircraft and missiles ===
- Abraham Iris, a 1930s French touring airplane
- Blackburn Iris, a 1920s British biplane flying boat
- IRIS-T, a German air-to-air missile
- Shahab-4 or IRIS, an Iranian liquid propelled missile

=== Automobiles ===
- Iris (car), a British car brand manufactured 1906–1925
- Desert Iris, a Jordanian 4x4 strategic auxiliary vehicle
- Tata Magic Iris, an Indian microvan
- Wallyscar Iris, a Tunisian mini SUV

=== Engines ===
- IRIS engine, a design for a type of internal combustion engine
- de Havilland Iris, a British four-cylinder, liquid-cooled, horizontally opposed aero engine

=== Rail transportation ===
- Iris (train), an international express train in Europe
- International Railway Industry Standard; see Union des Industries Ferroviaires Européennes

=== Watercraft ===
- List of ships named Iris, for any of several ships by that name
- French ship Iris, the name of several vessels
- HMS Iris, the name of several Royal Navy ships
- MV Royal Iris, a ferry operating until 1991
- USS Iris, the name of several U.S. Navy ships
- MV Royal Iris of the Mersey, a ferry operating since 2001
- IRIS, for Islamic Republic of Iran Ship, the prefix for Iranian naval vessels since 1979

== See also ==
- Irris, a South Korean girl group
- Iris Award (disambiguation)
- Iris II (disambiguation)
