= Iris (given name) =

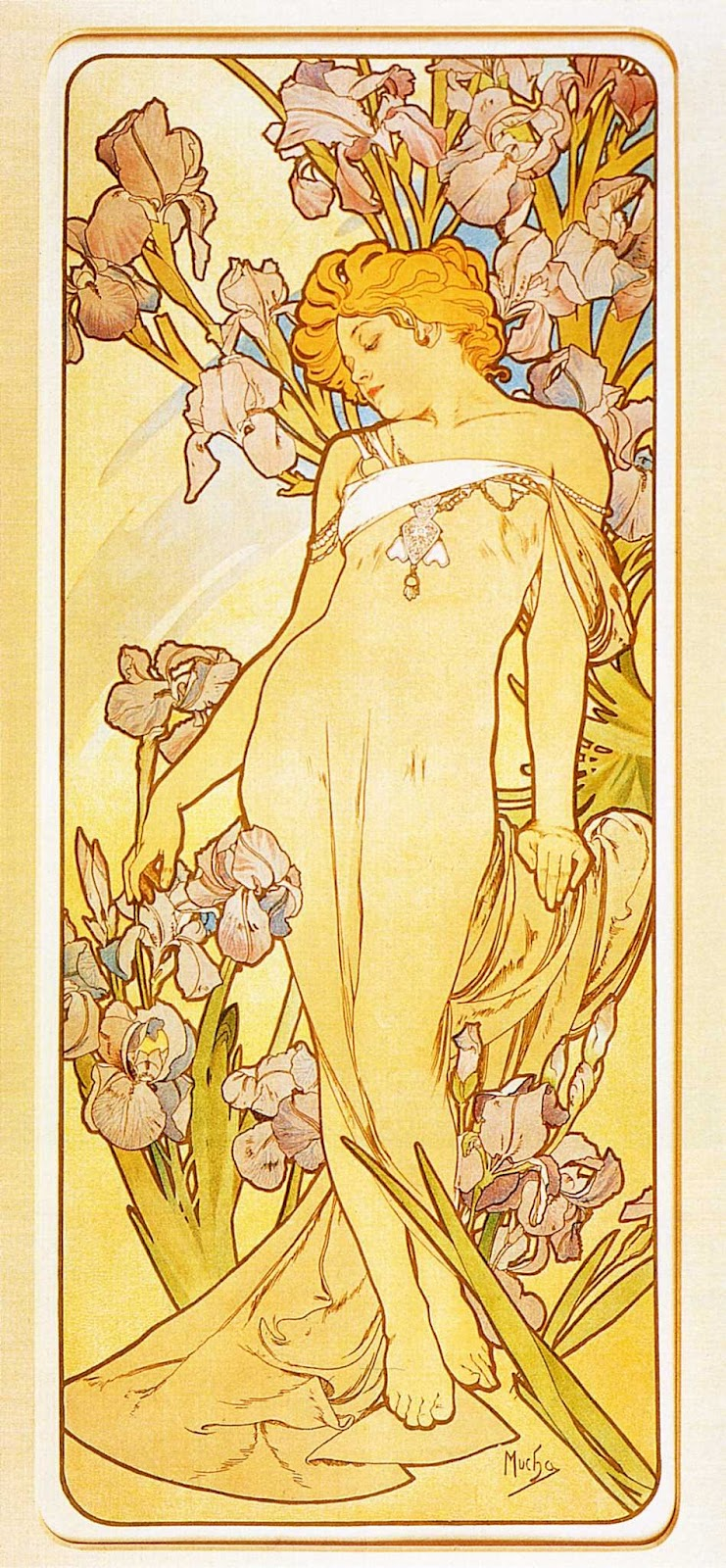
- Iris by Alfons Mucha
- Gender: Female

Origin
- Origin: Greek
- Meaning: "rainbow"

Other names
- Popularity: see popular names

Iris (from Greek Ἶρις Ancient Greek: [îːris], the messenger of the gods among themselves and the personification of ἶρις, the "rainbow") is a feminine name.

The name came into use in English-speaking countries in the 1500s, first in reference to the goddess, and was later used along with other Ancient Greek names revived by 17th-century British poets, such as Doris and Phyllis. It is also used in reference to the flowering plant and likely inspired the use of other botanical names that became popular in the Anglosphere during the Victorian era.

The name has ranked among the top 100 names given to baby girls in Belgium, England, France, Iceland, Italy, Netherlands, Norway, Portugal, Slovenia, Spain, Sweden, the United States, and Wales during the 2010s. It ranked 101st on the popularity chart in Canada in 2021, with 255 newborn Canadian girls given the name in that year.

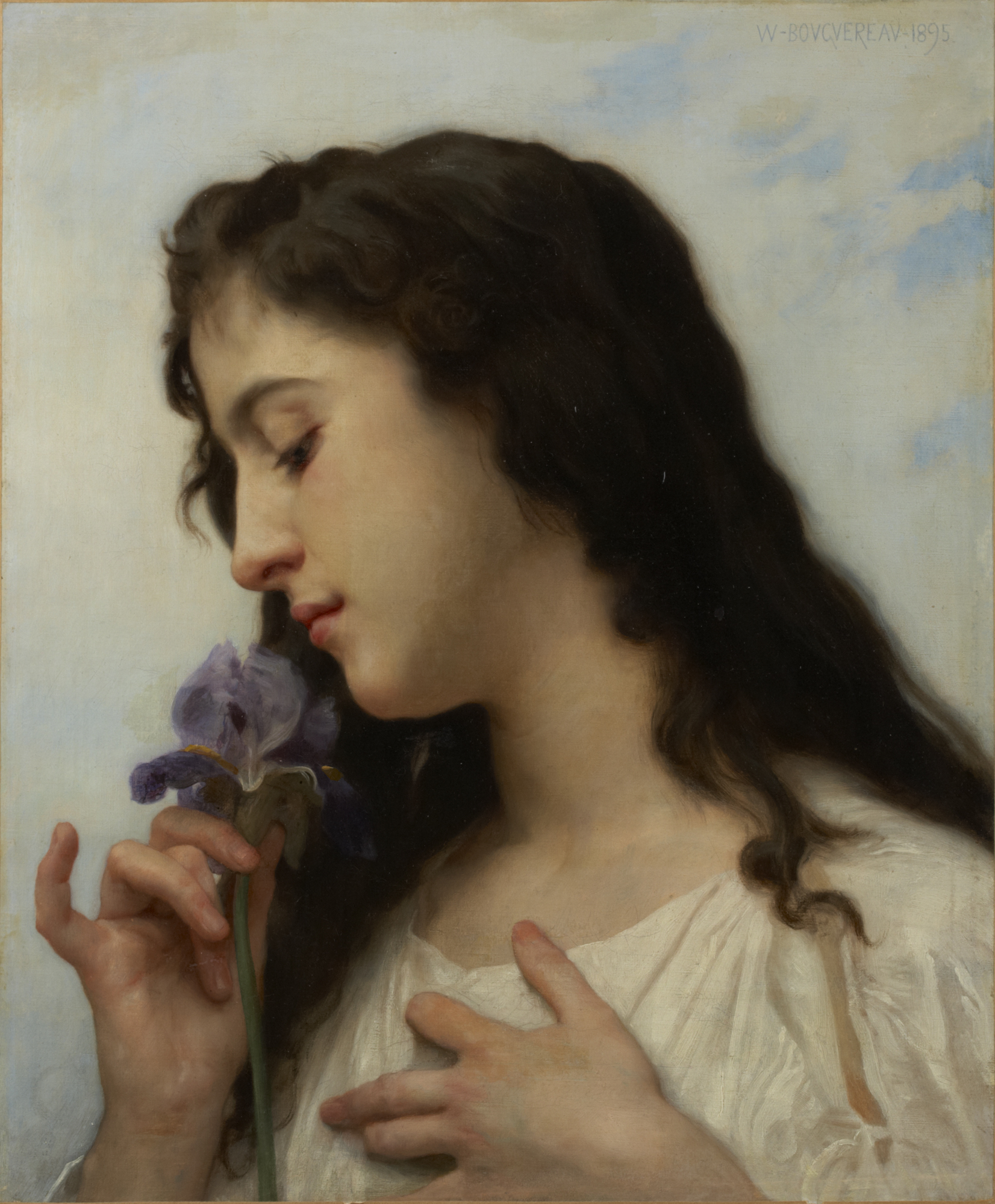
Woman with Iris by William-Adolphe Bouguereau, 1899

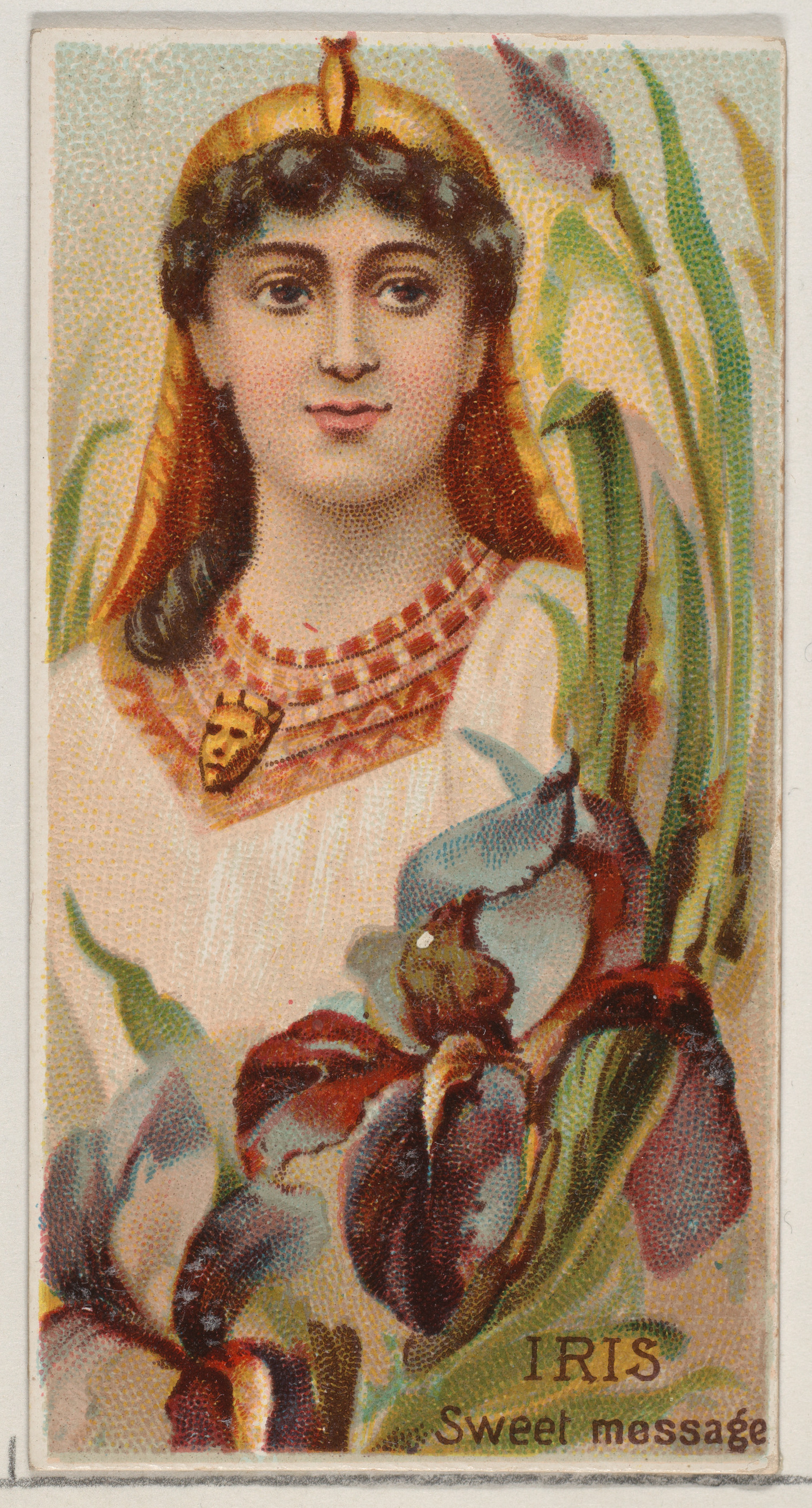
An iris is said to signify a sweet message in the language of flowers.

Notable people and characters with the name include:

== People ==
- Iris Adrian (1912–1994), American actress
- Iris Apfel (1921–2024), American interior designer
- Iris von Arnim (born 1945), German fashion designer
- Iris Ashley (1909–1994), Irish-born British stage and film actress
- Iris Apatow (born 2002), American actress
- Iris Bahr or Iris Bar-Ziv, American actress, comedian, director, writer and producer
- Iris Bannochie (1914–1988), Barbadian horticulturalist
- Iris Yassmin Barrios Aguilar, Guatemalan judge
- Iris Barry (1895–1969), American film critic
- Iris Bell, American psychologist and alternative medicine researcher
- Iris Berben (born 1950), German actress
- Iris Birtwistle (1918–2006), English lyric poet and gallery owner
- Iris Faircloth Blitch (1912–1993), United States Representative from Georgia
- Iris Bohnet (born 1966), Swiss academic, Professor of Public Policy
- Iris Burgoyne (1936–2014), South Australian author and Kokatha (Aboriginal) elder
- Iris Burton (1930–2008), American talent agent and dancer
- Iris Butler (1905–2002), English journalist and historian
- Iris Cahn, Professor of the Film Conservatory at SUNY Purchase College
- Iris Cantor (1931–2026), American philanthropist in medicine and the arts
- Iris Chacón (born 1950), Puerto Rican entertainer
- Iris Chang (1968–2004), American historian
- Iris Chung (born 1987), designer and model
- Iris Clert (died 1986), owner of the Galerie Iris Clert
- Iris Cummings (1920–2025), American aviator and Olympic swimmer
- Iris Davis (1950–2021), American track and field sprinter
- Iris Dawnay (1923–2021), British aristocrat and MI6 secretary
- Iris DeBrito (born 1945), Brazilian footballer
- Iris DeMent (born 1961), American singer
- Iris Dexter (1907–1974), Australian journalist and war correspondent
- Iris Dixon (1931–2022), Australian cyclist
- Iris Estabrook (born 1950), Democratic former member of the New Hampshire Senate
- Iris Evans (born 1941), Minister of the Legislative Assembly of Alberta
- Iris Falcam (1938–2010), American-born librarian, researcher and First Lady of Micronesia
- Iris Falcón (born 1973), Peruvian volleyball player
- Iris Fernández (born 1946), Argentine runner
- Iris Fontbona (born c.1943), Chilean businesswoman
- Iris Frederick (1928–2006), mother of Lynne Frederick
- Iris Fuentes-Pila (born 1980), Spanish middle-distance runner
- Iris Gordy (born 1943), American songwriter, producer, and music executive
- Iris Gower (1935–2010), Welsh novelist
- Iris Gusner (born 1941), German film director and screenwriter
- Iris Habib Elmasry (1910–1994), Egyptian historian
- Iris Halpern, American politician
- Iris Hanika (born 1962), German writer and journalist
- Iris Häussler (born 1962), German artist
- Iris Hensley (1934–2003), artistic director of the Georgia Ballet
- Iris Hoey (1885–1979), British actress
- Iris Holland (1920–2001), American politician
- Iris Jharap (born 1970), Dutch cricketer
- Iris Johansen (born 1938), American author
- Iris Kelso (1926–2003), American journalist
- Iris Winnifred King (1910–2000), mayor of Kingston
- Iris Klein, German beauty pageant contestant
- Iris Komar, German swimmer
- Iris Kramer (born 1981), German International motorcycle trials rider
- Iris Krasnow (born 1954), American author, journalism professor, and speaker
- Iris Kroes (born 1992), Dutch singer-songwriter and harpist
- Iris Kyle (born 1974), American professional bodybuilder
- Iris Lam Chen (born 1989), Chinese-Costa Rican arts manager and curator
- Iris Le Feuvre (1928–2022) (née Renouf), Jersey politician
- Iris Long (born 1934), AIDS activist
- Iris Loveridge (1917–2000), English classical pianist
- Iris Mack, American banker, professor and writer
- Iris Maity (born 1958), Indian model and actress
- Iris Martinez (born 1956), Democratic member of the Illinois Senate
- Iris Meléndez (died 2019), lawyer and prosecutor from Puerto Rico
- Íris Mendes (born 1996), Portuguese acrobatic gymnast
- Iris Vianey Mendoza (born 1981), Mexican politician and lawyer
- Iris Meredith (1915–1980), American actress
- Iris Mittenaere (born 1993), French model, Miss Universe and Miss France 2016
- Iris Mor (1952–2017), Israeli newspaper editor, literary editor and writer
- Iris Mora (born 1981), Mexican football forward
- Iris Morhammer (born 1973), Austrian handballer
- Iris Morley (1910–1953), English historian, writer and journalist
- Iris Mountbatten (1920–1982), English actress and model, great-granddaughter of Queen Victoria
- Iris Murdoch (1919–1999), British novelist
- Iris Nampeyo (ca. 1856–1942), Hopi–Tewa potter in Arizona
- Iris Nazmy (died 2018), Egyptian writer, journalist and film critic
- Iris Origo (1902–1988), Marchesa of Val d'Orcia, a British-born biographer and writer
- Iris M. Ovshinsky (1927–2006), American businesswoman
- Iris Owens (1929–2008), pseudonym Harriet Daimler, American novelist
- Iris Parush, Israeli scholar of Hebrew literature
- Iris Peterson (1921–2025), American flight attendant
- Iris Plotzitzka (born 1966), West German shot putter
- Iris Rabot (born 2000), French footballer
- Iris Rainer Dart (born 1944), American author and playwright
- Iris Rauskala (born 1978), Austrian civil servant and politician
- Iris Rideau (born c. 1937), American winemaker, businesswoman and activist
- Iris Riedel-Kühn (born 1954), German tennis player
- Iris Robinson (born 1949), Northern Irish politician
- Iris Rogers, English badminton player
- İris Rosenberger (born 1985), German-Turkish swimmer
- Iris Miriam Ruíz (born 1951), Puerto Rican politician
- Iris Runge (1888–1966), German applied mathematician and physicist
- Iris Sanchez, American politician
- Iris Santos (born 1984), Dominican volleyball and beach volleyball player
- Iris Sihvonen (1940–2010), Finnish speed skater
- Iris Sing (born 1990), taekwondo athlete from Brazil
- Iris Slappendel (born 1985), Dutch road racing cyclist
- Iris Smith (wrestler) (born 1979), American freestyle wrestler
- Iris Smyles, American writer
- Iris Strubegger (born 1984), Austrian model
- Iris Stuart (1903–1936), motion picture actress
- Iris Szeghy (born 1956), Slovak composer
- Iris Tanner (1906–1971), English swimmer
- Iris Tjonk (born 2000), Dutch swimmer
- Iris Tree (1897–1968), English poet, actress and artists' model
- Iris Vermillion (born 1960), German operatic mezzo-soprano
- Iris Versari (1922–1944), Italian partisan who was decorated with a Gold Medal of Military Valour on 16 April 1976
- Iris Völkner (born 1960), German rower
- Iris Wang (born 1994), American badminton player
- Iris Wedgwood (1887–1982), British author, topographer and historian
- Iris Weinshall (born 1953), commissioner of New York City Department of Transportation
- Iris Williams (born 1944), Welsh singer
- Iris Woolcock (died 1980), American artist, photographer, realtor and adventurer
- Iris Yamashita (born 1966), American screenwriter
- Iris Marion Young (1949–2006), American political scientist
- Iris M. Zavala (1936–2020), Puerto Rican author, scholar, and poet
- Iris Zimmermann (born 1981), American fencer
- Iris Zscherpe (born 1967), German swimmer

=== Fictional characters ===
- Iris, a character in Ace Attorney
- Iris, a character in American Horror Story: Hotel
- Iris, a character in Andi Mack
- Iris, the main character of the series LoliRock
- Iris, a character in Mega Man X4
- Iris, a gym leader in Pokémon Black 2 and White 2
- Iris, a character in Ruby Gloom
- Lady Iris, a character in The Land of Stories
- Iris Blanc/Noire, a character in Rune Factory Frontier
- Iris Clops, a character in Monster High
- Iris Henderson, a character in Alfred Hitchcock’s The Lady Vanishes
- Iris Lark, a character in Baghead
- Iris Simpkins, a character in The Holiday
- Iris "Easy" Steensma, a character in Taxi Driver
- Iris Thompson, also known as SCP-105, a character in the SCP Foundation
- Iris West, DC Comics character
- Iris Wildthyme, a character in the expansive universe of Doctor Who
- Iris Sagan, a character in the video game AI: The Somnium Files
- Iris Verdi, an alternate identity of Lila Rossi in the animated series Miraculous: Tales of Ladybug & Cat Noir

== Equivalents from other cultures ==
Foreign equivalents of Iris include:

- Eirys (Welsh)
- Elestren (Cornish)
- Ayame (Japanese)

== See also ==
- Iris (disambiguation)
- Iris (mythology)
- List of most popular given names
- Iiris (name)
