= List of equipment of the Royal Jordanian Army =

Royal Jordanian Army equipment

This is a list of equipment used by the Royal Jordanian Army.

== Small arms ==
Model	Image	Origin	Caliber	Type	Details
Pistols
Caracal		Austria; United Arab Emirates	9×19mm Parabellum	Pistol	Standard issue pistol. The hammerless Caracal pistol was developed by the Austrian handgun designer Wilhelm Bubits. 8,000+ acquired.
Viper Jaws		United States; Jordan	9x19mm Luger	Pistol	Standard issue pistol for the Jordanian armed forces.
Browning Hi-Power		Belgium	9×19mm	Pistol	
SIG Sauer P226		Germany; Switzerland	9×19mm	Pistol	
Glock 17; Glock 19		Austria	9×19mm	Pistol	Used By Royal Guard.
Beretta 92		Italy	9×19mm Parabellum	Pistol	
Heckler & Koch USP		Germany	9×19mm Parabellum	Pistol	
Assault rifles
M4 carbine		United States	5.56×45mm NATO	Assault rifle, Carbine	Standard issue carbine. Sold as part of a 2007 Foreign Military Sales package. Additional M4s sold as a 2008 Foreign Military Sales package.
M16 rifle		United States	5.56×45mm NATO	Assault rifle	M16A4 used by Border Guard Force Standard Issue Assault Rifle.
T86 assault rifle		Taiwan	5.56×45mm NATO	Assault rifle	Used by Jordan Royal Guard.
T91 assault rifle		Taiwan	5.56×45mm NATO	Assault rifle	Used by Jordan Royal Guard
Heckler & Koch G36		Germany	5.56×45mm NATO	Assault rifle, Carbine	Jordanian Special Operations Forces employ the G36C.
Heckler & Koch HK416		Germany	5.56×45mm NATO	Assault rifle	Used by Joint Special Operations Command (Jordan) only
Shotguns
Benelli M4		Italy	12 gauge	Shotgun	Standard shotgun.
Sniper rifles
DPMS Panther LR308		United States	5.56×45mm NATO	Designated marksman rifle	Standard Issue for all Infantry Units.
McMillan TAC-50		United States	.50 BMG	Sniper rifle	Standard issue for all Infantry Units.
Sako TRG		Finland	.260 Remington.338 Lapua Magnum	Sniper rifle	The TRG-22 and TRG-42 sniper rifles are used by Jordanian Special forces.
Steyr SSG 69		Austria	7.62×51mm NATO	Sniper rifle	Employed by Jordanian Special Operations Forces.
Barrett 50 Cal/M82		United States	.50 BMG	Anti materiel sniper rifle	Barrett M82A1 Versions.
Barrett M95		United States	.50 BMG	Anti materiel sniper rifle	Employed by Jordanian Special Operations Forces.
Submachine guns
Heckler & Koch MP5		Germany	9×19mm	Submachine gun	Used by Special Forces.
Heckler & Koch MP7		Germany	HK 4.6×30mm	Submachine gun	
Heckler & Koch UMP		Germany	9×19mm	Submachine gun	Used by Jordanian Special Operations Forces.
Machine guns
Heckler & Koch HK21		Germany	7.62×51mm NATO	General purpose medium machine gun	HK21A1 variant.
M60 machine gun		United States	7.62×51mm NATO	General purpose medium machine gun	
M240 machine gun		United States	7.62×51mm NATO	General purpose medium machine gun	Standard issue general-purpose machine gun.
M2 Browning Machine Gun		United States	.50 BMG	Heavy machine gun	1,261+ acquired. In use on tripods and as flexible gun on M113A2 Mk 1J armoured personnel carrier and other armoured vehicles.
Grenade launcher
Mk 19		United States	40mm	Grenade machine gun	
Milkor MGL		South Africa; South Africa	40mm	Grenade launcher	Used by Jordanian Special Forces.
M203		United States	40mm	Grenade launcher	

== Heavy equipment ==
=== Main battle tanks ===
Photo	Name	Origin	Type	Number	Notes
Main battle tanks (in service)
	Leclerc	France	Main battle tank	80	Donated by the United Arab Emirates in September 2020.
	Al-Hussein	United Kingdom	Main battle tank	c. 190 (in service) c. 210 (in storage)	United Kingdom supplied Jordan with 400 Challenger 1 tanks as part of a government-to-government deal in 2002. Currently there are 190 tanks in service.
	M60A3 Patton	United States	Main battle tank	182	Jordan upgraded four battalions of total 225 M60A3 tanks with IFCS by Raytheon.
Main battle tanks (in storage)
	M60A1 Patton	United States	Main battle tank	82	36 captured from Iran during the Iran–Iraq War and transferred by Saddam Hussein to Jordan in 1980. In storage, 20+ Converted to Al-Monjed A2 ARV by King Abdullah Design and Development Bureau (now Jordan Design and Development Bureau), 30 tanks donated to Lebanon and the remaining in storage.
	Khalid	United Kingdom	Main battle tank	274+90	The Khalid is essentially the Chieftain FV4030/2 MBT with minor modifications to suit Jordanian requirements. Jordan received 90 captured Iranian Chieftain tanks from Iraq after Iran–Iraq War but never used. Currently all in storage.
	Tariq	United Kingdom	Main battle tank	300-400	In storage, some converted to MAP II Heavy Armoured APC by King Abdullah Design and Development Bureau (now Jordan Design and Development Bureau).

=== Infantry carrier vehicle ===
Photo	Name	Origin	Type	Number	Notes
Infantry fighting vehicle
	Marder 1A3	Germany	Infantry fighting vehicle	75	Secondhand from Germany
	YPR-765	Netherlands	Infantry fighting vehicle	441	290+ YPR-765 pri 25mm IFV from Netherlands; 13 AIFV-B-C25 25mm IFV from Belgium
	FNSS ACV-15	Turkey	Infantry fighting vehicle	130	Bought from Turkey 130 units
Armoured personnel carrier
	M113A2MK-1J	United States	Armoured personnel carrier	370	Upgraded to Jordan configuration, including 70 M106A2, 93 M901 ITV, 7 M1059
	YPR-765	United States	Armoured personnel carrier	105	192 YPR-765 pri.50 including YPR-806 prbrg ARV from Netherlands; 48 AIFV-B from Belgium
	M577	United States	Command vehicle	269	Command vehicle based on the M113, 200 M577A2 received from the United States in 2012.
	FV103 Spartan	United Kingdom	Armoured personnel carrier	100	In storage

=== Reconnaissance vehicles ===
Photo	Name	Origin	Type	Number	Notes
	FV101 Scorpion	United Kingdom	Armoured fighting vehicle	26	50 Scorpions received from Belgium in 2001, 4 × AT-14 Kornet-E Ready to launch (upgraded By JERSCO).
	FV107 Scimitar	United Kingdom	Armoured fighting vehicle	75	Jordan had 75 Scimitar and obtained over 100 Scimitars in a 2006 deal that netted the British $20 million
	B1 Centauro	Italy	Wheeled tank destroyer	141	141 B1 Centauro (all ex Italian Army); some donated as Italian military aid and modernized with upgrade kits.

=== Mine-Resistant Ambush Protected Vehicle ===
Photo	Name	Origin	Type	Number	Notes
	MaxxPro MRAP	United States	Medium Mine Protected Vehicle	200	200 MaxxPro MRAP received through US EDA.
	Cougar CAT II MRAP	United States	Medium Mine Protected Vehicle	131	131 Cougar MRAP received through US EDA.
	RG-33L MRAP	South Africa	Medium Mine Protected Vehicle	200	200 RG-33L MRAP from the United States in 2018.
	Matador	South Africa	Medium Mine Protected Vehicle	50	
	Mbombe 6	South Africa	Medium Mine Protected Vehicle	50+	Delivered to Jordan some sent to Libya.

=== Artillery ===
Photo	Name	Origin	Type	Number	Notes
Rocket artillery
	HIMARS	United States	Rocket artillery	12	12 launchers with 72 M31A1 GMLRS Unitary pods and 24 M30A1 GMLRS-AW pods (each pod contains six missiles), option for additional 12 launchers.
	WM-120 MLRS	China	Rocket artillery	24	The system has a maximum range of 120 km (it appeared in a military drill conducted by JAF).
	Cyclone	Jordan	Rocket artillery	36	produced by Jordan Design and Development Bureau; The system entered service in the army in 2024
	SR-5	China	Rocket artillery	12	Entered service in 2023
Self-propelled artillery
	M109A2	United States	Self-propelled howitzer	358	78 M109A2 purchased from the United States, and 121 M109A2-90 purchased from the Netherlands.
	M110	United States	Self propelled howitzer	120	In service
Towed howitzer
	M119 howitzer	United States	Towed howitzer	12	The United States has donated 12 howitzers and 24 Humvees to the Jordan Armed forces (JAF). The howitzers are used by the QRF Brigade.
	M102A1	United States	Towed howitzer	50	Small number in service, majority in storage
	M114	United States	Towed howitzer	18	In storage
Mortar
	M252 mortar	United States	Mortar	267	JAF planned to completely replace the M29 mortar with M252 mortar in all units under Jordan Operational Engagement program (JOEP).
	M29 mortar	United States	Mortar	1,450	
	W-86	China	Mortar	200	200 W-86 120 mm mortar For JSOC; No longer in use. In storage
	WW-90	China	Mortar	375	375 WW-90 60 mm mortar No longer in use. In storage
	PPT89	China	Mortar	1275	1275 PPT89 60 mm mortar No longer in use. In storage
	M106A2 Mortar Carrier	United States		70	Bought from the USA.
Artillery-locating radars
	TPQ-36	United States	Weapon locating system	21	
	TPQ-37	United States	Weapon locating system	5	
	COBRA	Germany	Weapon locating system	5	5 COBRA Counter Battery Radars were donated from UK in 2016.
Precision-guided munitions
	M982 Excalibur	United States	Guided artillery shell	901+	More orders placed in 2018 and 2020.
	M712 Copperhead	United States	Precision-guided munitions	1000+	

=== Air defense ===
Photo	Name	Origin	Type	Number	Notes
Air defense missile system
	9K35 Strela-10	Soviet Union	Surface-to-air missile	92	Financed by Saddam Hussein in 1978 as reward for Jordanian volunteer unit fighting against Iran.
	MIM-104 Patriot	United States	Surface-to-air missile	3-6	Jordan operates 3-6 units some donated from Germany
	MIM-23 Hawk	United States	Surface-to-air missile	24	Acquired from the USA, 24 units.
Self-propelled anti-aircraft gun
	ZSU-23-4 Shilka	Soviet Union	Anti-aircraft gun	48	Financed by Saddam Hussein in 1982 as reward for Jordanian volunteer unit fighting against Iran.
	M163 Vulcan	United States	Anti-aircraft gun	100	81 VADS transferred to Jordan in 2005
Man-portable air-defense systems
	Igla-S	Soviet Union	Man-portable air-defense system	182	182 Dzhigit launchers (2x Igla-S) with Sagem vision on light vehicles.
	SA-18 Igla	Soviet Union	Man-portable air-defense system	100	Replaced SA-16 Igla-1 and SA-14 Strela-3

=== Ground radar and surveillance system ===
Photo	Name	Origin	Type	Number	Notes
	Distant Sentry	Italy; United States	Surveillance system		Border Control System (Including Ground Radars, Towers, Sensors, IR Cameras and Aerostats)

=== Utility vehicles ===
Photo	Name	Origin	Type	Number	Notes
	Humvee	United States	Multipurpose utility vehicle	600+	250 M998A0 HMMWVs, 50 M1165A1B3 HMMWVs received from the United States in 2013
	Jeep J8	United States	Multipurpose utility vehicle	350	Jordanian Armed Forces are set to receive an undisclosed number of Jeep J8 Patrol
	Nimr	United Arab Emirates	Multipurpose utility vehicle	255	
	Desert Iris	Jordan	Multipurpose utility vehicle	450	
	Al-Thalab (Fox) LRPV	Jordan	Multipurpose utility vehicle	1,200	
	AB2 Al-Jawad	Jordan	Multipurpose utility vehicle	289	
	LTATV	Jordan	All terrain vehicle	345	KADDB has already received orders for 50 ATVs.
	Toyota Land Cruiser (J70)	Japan	Light utility vehicle	101	Used in large numbers and numerous variants with border security forces and some army units

=== Anti-tank weapons ===
Photo	Name	Origin	Type	Number	Notes
Tank destroyer
	M901 ITV	United States	Tank destroyer	93+	Numbers of M901 ITV might be much higher than 93.
	YPR-765 prat	United States	Tank destroyer	155+	Received with Tow Under Armor (TUA) from Netherlands
Anti-tank guided missile
	BGM-71 TOW	United States	Anti-tank missile	300	Jordan received 300 Tow-2A Wireless RF systems in 2016 to replace all old TOW-2 units. 1132 BGM-71E TOW-2A missiles and 400 BGM-71F TOW-2B missiles.
	FGM-148 Javelin	United States	Anti-tank missile	192+	192 CLUs with 1924 missiles delivered. More systems ordered in 2017. The Javelin replaced the M47 Dragon and currently its the standard issue for all infantry battalions.
	9M133 Kornet	Russia	Anti-tank missile	200	200 launchers and 2,000 missiles
Rocket-propelled grenade
	RPG-32	Russia; Jordan	Rocket-propelled grenade	25,000	15,000 training units (Jordan will manufacture 60,000 Nashab units annually), the system name has been changed from Hashim to Nashab. Standard issue for all infantry battalions.
	RPG-26	Soviet Union	Rocket-propelled grenade	3,000	Used mainly for anti-structure by infantry units
	RPG-27	Soviet Union	Rocket-propelled grenade	6,000	Used mainly for anti-structure by infantry units
	RGW-90 AS	Germany	Recoilless rifle anti-structure	385	Jordan received 385 RGW-90 AS from Germany. Used by special forces, QRF and special mission brigade.

=== Logistic and engineering vehicles ===
Photo	Name	Origin	Type	Number	Notes
Armoured recovery vehicle
	AL Monjed ARV	Jordan	Armoured recovery vehicle	20	AL-Monjed ARV based on M-60A1 tank
	FV4204 ARV	United Kingdom	Armoured recovery vehicle	49	
	Leopard 1 ARV	West Germany	Armoured recovery vehicle	5	Five Leopard 1 armoured recovery vehicles will be handed over to Jordan from Netherlands together with two Leopard 1 main battle tanks (MBT), which will be used for spare parts.
	M88 Recovery Vehicle	United States	Armoured recovery vehicle	52	22x M88A2 purchased from the U.S. Anniston Army Depot in April 2012 (to be rebuilt and, potentially, upgraded either at Anniston Army Depot or at the King Hussein Maintenance Facility in Jordan).
	M578 Light Recovery Vehicle	United States	Armoured recovery vehicle	30	Used with M110A2 Howitzer
	YPR-806 and M806	United States	Armoured recovery vehicle	90+	24 M113 ARV received from Belgium in 2008/2010. Additional 17 YPR-806 ARV received from Netherlands in 2012.
Cargo truck
	HEMTT	United States	8x8 off-road heavy cargo truck	≈ 100	
	FMTV	United States	Cargo truck	≈ 300	M1078, M1083, M1085A1, M1089, M1091; Replaces M35, M800 and M900 cargo trucks.
	Navistar 7000-MV	United States	Cargo truck	100	Replaces M35, M800 and M900 cargo trucks.
	Mercedes-Benz Zetros	Germany	Cargo truck	70	Germany donated 20 Zetros 2733 A 6×6 trucks and 50 Zetros 1833 A 4×4 trucks.Daniel, Replaces M35, M800 and M900 cargo trucks.
	DAF Trucks	Netherlands	Cargo truck	967	467 various DAF trucks (DAF4442 and YAK/YAS2300) received from Netherlands. Another 500 Military DAF Trucks ordered from Netherlands in 2018 (250 type YAD, 250 type YAS). Replaces M35, M800 and M900 cargo trucks.
Engineering vehicle
	Caterpillar D9	United States	Heavy armored bulldozer	NA	
	Caterpillar D8	United States	Heavy armored bulldozer	NA	
	Caterpillar D7G	United States	Heavy armored bulldozer	NA	
	Caterpillar CAT 924, 930, 950 & 966	United States	Loader	NA	
	Caterpillar 349E	United States	Large excavator	NA	
	Caterpillar 12G, 14M & 120M	United States	Motorgraders	NA	
	Komatsu D155A, D275A	Japan	Heavy bulldozer	NA	
	Komatsu PC400	Japan	Large excavator	NA	
	Husky 2G	United States	Vehicle-mounted mine detection	NA	Jordan placed an order in 2017.
	M58 MICLIC	United States	Mine clearing	NA	
	Aardvark JSFU	United Kingdom	Mine clearing	12+	Aardvark Mk 2/3 flail
	Pearson Combat Dozer UDK1	United Kingdom	Combat dozer	60+	For Challenger-1 tank
Heavy Equipment Transport System
	Oshkosh M1070	United States	Heavy Equipment Transport System	110	Jordan received 50 M1070A0 with 635NL semi-trailers in 2004. 60 M1070P1 with 50 M1000 semi-trailers delivered in December 2018 through US EDA.
	M915A2	United States	Heavy Equipment Transport System	60	60 M915A2 received from the United States in 2012.
	Scammell Commander	United Kingdom	Heavy Equipment Transport System	100	No longer in use, replaced with Oshkosh M1070.
