= Iris Lam Chen =

Costa Rican curator (born 1989)

- Born: Iris Lam Chen; 22 September 1989 (age 36); Costa Rica
- Education: University of Costa Rica (BS), Universidad Estatal a Distancia (MBA), Baruch College (MA)
- Occupations: Arts Administrator and Curator
- Years active: 2015-currently
- Known for: Centro Cultural de España en Costa Rica
- Awards: AAUW International Scholarship and P.E.O Sisterhood International Peace Scholarship

Iris Lam Chen (San José, 22 September 1989) is a Chinese-Costa Rican arts manager and curator known for her work in visual arts project management at the Cultural Center of Spain in Costa Rica, y artistic strategy in La Vivera Oficina organization in which she is director and co-founder . Her work emphasizes themes related to ecofeminism, the LGBTQIA+ community, migration, strategy, the artistic market, and inter-institutional alliances between public, private, independent and academic entities.

== Career and outstanding projects ==
Iris Lam was cultural manager of the Cultural Center of Spain in Costa Rica, where she coordinated all the projects and exhibitions of visual arts, music and experimental arts with technology from 2018 to 2026, among which the International Artist Residency program stands out. Much of her work was focused on generating alliances and inter-institutional projects of a public-private, national and international nature, for example with the La Neomudéjar Museum (Spain), MAV Biennial (Spain), espacio/C (Guatemala), Quorum Cultural Laboratory (Panama), Museum of Contemporary Art and Design (Costa Rica), La Revuelta (Guatemala), Plataforma Caníbal (Colombia), Ensayo y Error (El Salvador), Y.ES Contemporary, (El Salvador), Red de Arte del Centro de América (GUA), Building Bridges Art Exchange (USA), NYLAAT (USA), perfoREDmx (MEX), LL Proyectos (Honduras), National Gallery (Costa Rica), Cartago Municipal Museum (Costa Rica), Women's Museum (Costa Rica), Women Watching Women (Spain), among others.

Since 2018 and until 2026, at the Cultural Center of Spain in Costa Rica, she coordinated the International Artists Residency project, which seeks to strengthen contemporary artistic creation and production, at the same time connecting and exchanging artists from different regions. Among the exchanges, she carries out residences with the La Neomudéjar Museum in Spain, Plataforma Caníbal in Colombia and with the Network of Cultural Centers of Spain in Central America and the Caribbean. She also manages the Creative Processes Experimentation Program that seeks to promote new alternative forms of research in various artistic disciplines, promoting an exchange of knowledge of cultural practices between Central American regions. As part of this program, she leads the programming and curatorship of the exhibitions that are given annually both in the halls of the Cultural Center of Spain in Costa Rica and those that are carried out internationally in alliance with other institutions, such as Reactivando Videografías together with the Royal Academy of Spain in Rome, a video art exhibition of which she is co-curator. In the same institution, she also seeks to facilitate the conditions to promote a critical approach to contemporary cultural practices, encouraging participation and generating a permanent dialogue between creators, cultural researchers and the diversity of audiences, through the Cultural Contemporary Practices Mediation Program.

On the other hand, in her work at La Vivera Oficina, she is in charge of the management, consultancy, production and organization of independent and private cultural projects, in which her first project stands out, the Human Suit Cultural Circuit, declared of national cultural interest in Costa Rica. Related to this, she produced the Costa Rican participation in the Tijuana International Triennial of Pictorial Art ("024), the SACO Contemporary Art Biennale in Chile (2021), held at the Historic Pier of Antofagasta, in the Camagüey International Video Art Festival (2021), held at the headquarters of the Circuit for the Exhibition and Development of New Media, in the artistic exchange program between China, Latin America and the Caribbean of the Ministry of Culture of China (2021), in the VII Festival of Latin American and Caribbean Art in China (2019) at the Beijing World Art Museum, the Artist-in-Residence for the 6th Season of Beijing Latin American Art (2019) at the Hanwei International Arts Center, and the Official Issue of Envelopes and Stamps China Post 70th Anniversary of the Republic of China (2019) and Beijing International Art Biennale (2017) commemorative at the National Art Museum of China.

She has been a professor of Cultural Management at the University of Costa Rica with courses related to cultural marketing and strategy. UCR is the only university in Latin America that has a bachelor's degree in cultural management. At UCR she is also a researcher on genealogy and Chinese migration in Costa Rica.

== Distinctive work themes ==
=== Ecofeminisms, Transfeminisms and LGBTIQ+ ===
In the different projects managed by Iris, feminism is one of the recurring themes. Through them, from independent initiatives and mainly with the Cultural Center of Spain in Costa Rica, she has contributed and collaborated to achieve a greater visualization of initiatives by different artists, researchers and institutions that focus on feminist issues. The interview dossier published in the Cuban-American art and culture magazine Hypermedia Magazine stands out, in which nine outstanding curators and artists from Latin America are interviewed and linked, promoting her work and creating interdisciplinary relationships. Asimismo, es socia de Mujeres Mirando Mujeres, donde artículos de abordaje de proyectos feministas fueron publicados en su edición 2021, 2022 y 2023

In the Cultural Center of Spain in Costa Rica (CCE Costa Rica) it is worth mentioning the management and production of the Circuit of Feminist Artistic Practices, an initiative of the Museum of Women and Casa Ma of Costa Rica and LL Proyectos of Honduras, with which it seeks to make visible the work of women artists, promote the insertion of women in the management of cultural spaces and activities and create inter-institutional alliances around feminist movements. She also served as general coordinator, under the direction of Ricardo Ramón Jarne, of the project Right to Life: Ecofeminist Perspectives in Ibero-America and Equatorial Guinea, initiated at CCE Costa Rica and promoted by the AECID Network of Cultural Centers. The project brought visibility to the artistic work of women from Ibero-America and Equatorial Guinea, highlighting their capacity to raise awareness of global issues such as climate change, gender equality, and the fair distribution of resources through exhibitions, panel discussions, and cultural programming across 15 Spanish Cultural Centers within the AECID network. The project originated from the catalyst exhibition in Costa Rica, Right to Life: Ecofeminist Perspectives in Costa Rica, which was managed by Iris and for which curator Marta Rosa Cardoso Ferrer was invited. In addition to this circuit, her work in artistic residencies and training programs is also feminist through the incorporation of these themes as a central axis.

In relation to this, also at the Cultural Center of Spain in Costa Rica, she is usually in charge of LGBTIQ+ themed content. In 2021 she was the producer of the podcast Quiero Queer in collaboration with the Museum of Identity and Pride, in which 16 artists from the LGBTIQ+ community of Costa Rica were interviewed to address their intentions and background of their work as well as in a second season in 2022 with people over 50 to explore the socio-affective experiences of their youth, and a third season in 2023 with interviews of drag artists of the Costa Rican scene. Also in 2019 she co-produced the artistic residency Drag from Yesterday and the Future together with the Cultural Center of Spain in Nicaragua and Operación Queer, the first Central American artistic residency that explored the drag culture as performance political and gender. She was also responsible for the management and production of the Cultural Center of Spain Costa Rica’s float for the 2023 PRIDE parade, in collaboration with the MIO Museum. This marked the first time a cultural institution participated in the parade with its own float. She later managed the CCECR’s open call for the 2025 float.

=== Diversity, Sinology and Anti-racism ===
As part of the approach to diversity in favor of human rights, Iris has also been researching sinology since 2012. Her project "Genealogical Cartographies of Chinese Migration in Costa Rica: A Reidentification of Costa Rican Ethnicity" investigates the interconnections among Chinese families in Costa Rica to promote the elimination of xenophobia against the Chinese-descendant community, through the deepening of Costa Rican ethnicity due to its genealogical links with the Chinese migration in Costa Rica that dates back more than 165 years.

As a researcher in Sinology, she is a member of the Latin American Academic Network for Sinological Studies, and a collaborator with the Program for the Recovery of the Historical Memory of Chinese Migration in Costa Rica (PREMEHCHI), both academic initiatives of the University of Costa Rica.

Also, Iris was the curator and producer of the artistic project Human Suit, declared of Costa Rican national cultural interest and internationally awarded, which has represented Costa Rica in several international calls and in which a little more than 30 artists have been involved, extended to various creative disciplines. This project is a curatorial proposal with the artist Man Yu, around the concept of the layers of existence of the being represented through the skin, which advocates the recognition of the human being beyond physical differences.

=== Art and strategy ===
In addition to her executive dedication to cultural management, Iris has researched various topics related to art and market strategy. During her Master’s degree in Strategic Management at the Universidad Estatal a Distancia, she devoted her thesis, “How Is the Rice, and How Do You Cook It in the Costa Rican Pictorial Art Market?”, to analyzing the dynamics of the art market in Costa Rica and proposing a commercial strategy framework for emerging artists. This thesis was supervised by the chief curator of the Museum of Contemporary Art and Design and was later published as a practical workbook for visual artists, available in several bookstores in Costa Rica and on Kindle.

She also devoted her second Master’s thesis, in Arts Administration at Baruch College of The City University of New York, to developing another practical tool for self-managed artists. Her thesis, titled “Too Much To Do, Not Enough Time, People Or Money To Do It,” focused on designing a handbook for leaders of emerging visual arts organizations, providing practical guidance for artists leading collective initiatives in areas such as general management, budgeting, finance, programming, and operations. The project drew on Iris’s previous experience and her work as a consultant for the New York Odissey Film Festival short-film festival. For her thesis proposal, she received an International Fellowship from the American Association of University Women and an International Peace Scholarship from the P.E.O. Sisterhood.

Around these topics, Iris has been a lecturer and facilitator of training programs for artists in different public and private entities, such as the University of Costa Rica, the Veritas University, the Artists House, the Committee for the Improvement of the Costa Rican Association of Visual Artists and the Sonoran Institute of Culture in Mexico and is the director of La Vivera Oficina, an independent cultural office dedicated to strategic cultural management with Tatiana Muñoz Brenes.
