= ASM =

ASM may refer to:

== Codes ==
- American Samoa, ISO 3166-1 alpha-3 country code
- Asmara International Airport, IATA airport code
- Assamese language, ISO 639 language code asm

== Organizations ==
=== Companies ===
- Aare Seeland mobil, a Swiss bus and train operator
- ASM International (company), a Dutch semiconductor company
- American Spirit Media, an American broadcasting company

=== Societies and professional organizations ===
- ASM International (society), formerly the American Society for Metals, a professional organization for materials scientists and metallurgists
- American Society of Mammalogists
- American Society for Microbiology
- American Society of Muslims
- Australian Society of Magicians
- Assotsiatsia Sovremennoi Muzyki (Ассоциация Современной Музыки (АСМ) in Russian, Association for Contemporary Music in English), a Russian organization

=== Sports ===
- ASM Clermont Auvergne France, a rugby union club
- ASM Formule 3, a French motorsport team
- ASM Team, a Portuguese motorsport team in the Le Mans Series
- AS Monaco FC, a French association football club

=== Other organizations ===
- Albanian School of Magistrates
- Academy of Sciences of Moldova
- American School of Milan
- Associated Students of Madison, the student government of the University of Wisconsin- Madison

== Military ==
- Academy Sergeant Major, the senior warrant officer at the Australian Defence Force Academy
- Air-to-surface missile
- Anti-ship missile
- Anti-Structures Munition
- Artificer Sergeant Major, a warrant officer appointment in the British Army's Corps of Royal Electrical and Mechanical Engineers
- Australian Service Medal

== Computer science ==
- Assembly language
  - The keyword asm to use an inline assembler in C and related languages
- ObjectWeb ASM, a Java library for bytecode modification and analysis
- Abstract state machines
- Active shape model, a deformable contour model used in computer vision
- Algorithmic state machine, for designing finite state machines
- Any-source multicast
- asm.js, a subset of the Javascript programming language
- Assembly (demo party), a demoscene event in Finland
- Automatic Storage Management, in an Oracle database
- Application Service Management
- App Shell Model, An architectural approach in PWA

== Transportation ==
- Available seat miles of an airline, railroad, or bus route
- Aare Seeland mobil, a transport company in Switzerland

== Arts and media ==
- Assistant stage manager in theater
- Aktueller Software Markt, a German video game magazine
- A State of Mind - a contemporary hip hop trio currently signed with Chinese Man records

== Other ==
- Sphingomyelin phosphodiesterase 1 or acid sphingomyelinase
- Abelian sandpile model, a cellular automaton model
- Ambulance Service Medal (Australia)
- Abnormal Situation Management Consortium, in alarm management
- Alternating sign matrix in combinatorics
- American system of manufacturing
