= Iria (disambiguation) =

Iria: Zeiram the Animation is a six-part anime series with starring its eponymous protagonist, Iria.

Iria or IRIA may also refer to:

- Saint Iria, (c.635–653), Portuguese saint
- Iria (river) or Staffora, a river in north-west Italy
- Voghera or Iria, a town of in Lombardy
- Santa Iria de Azoia, a town within the municipality of Loures, Portugal
- Islamic Republic of Iran Army
- Institut de recherche en informatique et en automatique, a French computer science research institute
- Iria, from Albanian mythology

== See also ==
- Iria Sylvestoli, a character in Star Ocean
- Cova da Iria, in Fátima, Portugal
- Iria Flavia, the former bishopric in Galicia (Spain)
- Irene (disambiguation)
- Iris (given name)
- Ira (name)
