= Iris II =

Iris II or Iris 2 or variants may refer to:

- HMS Iris II, Royal Navy ship
- SS Iris II, cargo ship in service 1963-67
- IRIS II, bulk carrier 224-m long, IMO:9286906
- Abraham AS-2 Iris II, Abraham airplane of 1930s France
- Blackburn Iris II, variant of the Blackburn Iris airplane
- Iris II (album), 1987 album by Romanian rock band Iris
- Iris II: New Generation, a South Korean TV series, also known as Iris II
- IRIS², a planned EU satellite constellation
- the 1968 satellite ESRO 2B, also known as Iris 2

== See also ==
- Iris (disambiguation)
