= USS Shiloh =

USS Shiloh may refer to the following ships of the United States Navy:

- USS Shiloh (1863) was one of the first of the Casco-class monitors to be launched in the United States Navy.
- USS Shiloh (CG-67) is a Ticonderoga-class guided missile cruiser
