= List of ships named Iris =

Several ships have been named Iris:

- Iris (1783 ship) was launched at Liverpool as a slaver. In all she made eight voyages (1783–1800) carrying slaves from West Africa to the Caribbean before she was condemned as unseaworthy in 1800. She also made one voyage for the British East India Company (EIC) to Bengal and back (1795–1796).
- Iris (1803 ship) was launched in France in 1794 and came into British hands in 1803, probably by purchase. She became a whaler in the British southern whale fishery. In 1805 she made an unsuccessful attack on a Batavian vessel. Iris was condemned as unseaworthy in late 1805 on her way home after her first voyage as a whaler.
- Iris (1811 ship) was launched at Shields. She first sailed as a London-based transport. In 1819 she was wrecked on a voyage to India.
- Iris (1866 ship) was a schooner launched at Port Huron, Michigan, that sailed the Great Lakes and was wrecked in 1913.

== See also ==
- French ship Iris - one of at least four ships that served the French Navy
- HMS Iris – one of nine vessels that served the British Royal Navy
- USS Iris - one of six vessels that served the United States Navy
