= Foundation University Islamabad =

University in Pakistan

- دانش گاہِ اساسی اسلام آباد
- FUI
- Other name: FUI
- Type: Public
- Established: 2002
- Accreditation: Higher Education Commission of Pakistan (HEC); PMC, PNC, NBEAC, NCEAC, NTC
- Chancellor: Lt Gen Muhammad Ali, HI(M) (Retd)
- President: Lt Gen Anwar Ali Hayder, HI(M) (Retd)
- Rector: Maj Gen Muhammad Kaleem Asif, HI(M) (Retd)
- Location: Islamabad, Pakistan
- Campus: Urban
- Colours: Iris & white
- Website: fui.edu.pk

Foundation University Islamabad (FUI) (Urdu: دانش گاہِ اساسی اسلام آباد) is a university located in Islamabad, Pakistan. It is an affiliated project of the Fauji Foundation which is a charitable trust for the Welfare of ex-servicemen of armed forces and their dependents.

== Overview ==
Foundation University Islamabad is a recognized university by the Higher Education Commission of Pakistan.

FUI is a government university, backed by the government's Fauji Foundation which is the largest welfare organization in Pakistan. FUI was granted its charter by the Federal Government vide Ordinance No. LXXXVIII of 2002.

The University consists of the Foundation University School of Science & Technology (FUSST) and the Foundation University School of Health Sciences (FUSH).

== Foundation University School of Health Sciences ==
The Foundation University School of Health Sciences (FUSH) consists of Foundation University Medical College (FUMC), Foundation University College of Dentistry (FUCD), Foundation University College of Physical Therapy (FUCP), Foundation University College of Nursing (FUCN) the University Secretariat and Fauji Foundation Hospital (FFH) (Teaching Hospital of FUMC).
