= Abraham (aircraft manufacturer) =

Former French aircraft manufacturer

- Founded: 1930
- Founder: Edmond Abraham
- Defunct: 1931
- Fate: defunct
- Headquarters: France
- Products: General Aviation Aircraft

Abraham was a French aircraft manufacturer of the 1930s.

Abraham built a two-seat parasol aircraft, the Abraham Iris.

== Aircraft ==
Summary of aircraft built by Abraham
| Model name | First flight | Number built | Type |
|---|---|---|---|
| Abraham Iris | 1930 | Number built | Parasol Monoplane |
