= Iiris (name) =

Female given name

Iiris is a Finnish and Estonian female given name. Iiris is a version of the international name Iris.

== People ==
- Iiris Hovatta (born 1970), Finnish geneticist and neuroscientist
- Iiris Vesik (born 1991), Estonian singer
- Iiris Suomela (born 1994), Finnish politician

== See also ==
- Iris (disambiguation)
