= Iris Award =

Iris Award may refer to:

- Iris Award (Spain), given by the Academy of Television Arts and Sciences
- Iris Award (United States)
- Iris Award (Uruguay), radio and television awards given by the newspaper El País
- Iris Prize, an international LGBT short film award
- Prix Iris, a Canadian film award given by Québec Cinéma

== See also ==
- Iris (disambiguation)
