= Menachem Brinker =

Israeli philosopher

Menachem Brinker (Hebrew: מנחם ברינקר; 20 September 1935 – 11 August 2016) was an Israeli philosopher, literary scholar and activist.

== Background ==
Menachem Brinker was born in Jerusalem in 1935. He attended the Hebrew University Secondary School. Before entering university, Brinker worked as a shepherd in a left-wing kibbutz. In 1956, he received his B.A. in literature and philosophy from Hebrew University in Jerusalem. In 1960, he earned his M.A. in philosophy at Hebrew University, and in 1973, he received his Ph.D. from Tel Aviv University. Brinker's early academic career included teaching in the philosophy and literature departments at Tel Aviv University, editing an Israeli literary journal (MASSA), and founding and editing a journal for culture and social affairs (EMDAH). In 1976–79, Brinker served as the chairman of the Israel Association of Philosophy. In 1978–79, Brinker taught Jewish studies and literature at Harvard University. In 1988, Brinker became a full professor at Hebrew University and became professor emeritus in 2000.

Brinker was the first Henry Crown Professor of Modern Hebrew Language and Literature in Near Eastern Languages & Civilizations at the University of Chicago, established the Modern Hebrew Language and Literature program in 1995 and held the first chair in the program. Brinker also was a prominent political activist who was one of the first to advocate for a two-state solution to the Israeli–Palestinian conflict.

Some of Brinker's research works address the question of defining the specific nature of artistic literature (or belles-lettres), as opposed to other kinds of texts. In other works, Brinker discusses the social impact of literature. In this context, he wrote two monographs: one on Jean-Paul Sartre and the other on the Hebrew writer Y.H. Brenner. According to Brinker, these two writers had the ambition to make an impact through their works on society and historical processes. Brinker also wrote numerous articles on various modern philosophers and edited about 20 books in the fields of literary studies and philosophy.

Brinker was awarded the Israel Prize in the research of Hebrew and General Literature (2004) and from 2008 he was a member of the Israel Academy of Sciences and Humanities.

== Awards ==
- Israel Prize (2004)

== Books ==
- Representation and Meaning in the Fictional Work (Hebrew: מבעד למדומה : משמעות וייצוג מציאות ביצירה הבדיונית). Hakibbutz Hameuchad Publishing House, 1980
- Aesthetics as Theory of Criticism: Topics and Landmarks in Its History (Hebrew: אסתטיקה כתורת הביקורת : סוגיות ותחנות בתולדותיה). Israel Ministry of Defense Publishing House, 1982
- Is Literary Theory Possible? (Hebrew: האם תורת הספרות אפשרית?). Sifriat HaPoalim, 1989
- Narrative Art and Social Thought in Y. H. Brenner's Work (Hebrew: עד הסימטה הטבריינית : מאמר על סיפור ומחשבה ביצירת ברנר). Am Oved Publishing, 1990
- Jean Paul Sartre: Roads to Freedom: Literature, Philosophy and Politics in the Work of Sartre (Hebrew: ז'ן פול סרטר: דרכי החירות : ספרות, פילוסופיה ופוליטיקה ביצירת סרטר). Israel Ministry of Defense Publishing House, 1992
- About Literature: Essays on the Borderline of Philosophy of Art and Literary Theory (Hebrew: סובב ספרות : מאמרים על גבול הפילוסופיה ותורת הספרות והאמנות). The Hebrew University Magnes Press, 2000
- Modern Hebrew Literature as European Literature (Hebrew: הספרות העברית כספרות אירופית). Carmel Publishing, 2016

== See also ==
- Iris Parush, Brinker's doctoral student
