= Tatiana Muñoz Brenes =

Costa Rican curator

- Born: Tatiana Muñoz Brenes; 4 April 1986 (age 40); Costa Rica
- Education: University of Costa Rica
- Occupation: Curator
- Years active: 2015-currently
- Known for: Museum of Identity and Pride, ICOM

Tatiana Muñoz Brenes is a Costa Rican art curator specializing in queer and transfeminist art. She graduated in Art History and Psychology from the University of Costa Rica, where she works as a researcher and teacher. She is a member of the Board of Directors of ICOM Costa Rica. She is a winner of the Fulbright scholarship, she is pursuing a master's degree in Museum Studies from the New York University.

As an independent curator, her training has also allowed her to work on the topics of community museums, sustainability, collection research, exhibition curation, and curatorial accompaniment of artistic production. He has experience in international projects, presentations, publications and museum training in the United Kingdom, Portugal, Spain, China, Japan, Ecuador, the United States of America and others, with entities such as the Museum of Identity and Pride (MIO), the Cultural Center of Spain, the Museum of Contemporary Art and Design, the National Theater Company, the Lankester Botanical Garden, the Calderón Guardia Museum, the +UCR Museum, the National Museum, the International Council of Museums (ICOM), the College Art Association, the Getty Foundation, the University of Saint Andrews in Scotland and The 8th Floor Gallery in New York.

Her professional practice is motivated by the artivisms decolonial that question the history of official art and the promotion of human rights, especially for the LGBTIQ+ community and women.

== Career and distinctive work themes ==
=== Transfeminisms ===
Many of the projects directed and curated by Muñoz Brenes are feminist in nature, both through the research and the works included, as well as in the framework of the execution of her work. One of her outstanding projects around this is "The Heart Howls: Latin American Feminist Performance and Revolt" winner of the first curatorial call for the Shelley and Donald Rubin Foundation in 2022, which was exhibited at The 8th Floor gallery in NY. This exhibition, co-curated by Alexis Heller, denounces femicides through a curatorship of performance works made by 14 female, trans, cis and non-binary artists from Costa Rica, Guatemala, Peru, Mexico, El Salvador, Chile, Brazil and Argentina. The exhibition includes works by Nayla Altamirano, Denise E. Reyes Amaya, Elina Chauvet, Cristina Flores, Regina José Galindo, Fernanda Laguna and Cecilia Palmeiro, Flavia Marcus Bien, Luiza Prado de O Martins, Rossella Matamoros-Jiménez, Bárbara Milano, Wynnie Mynerva, Jazmín Ra, and Berna Reale.

Another notable feminist curatorial project is "Mammographies of a woman who does not exist", an individual exhibition by the artist Mariela A. Porras-Chaverri, who is also a doctor in Medical Physics. Through conceptual art, she denounces the academy, exposing the frustrations of Mariela Porras' place as a woman scientist who thinks and feels, and speaks for women as bodies-objects of study, by denouncing the dissonance between the bodies that produce the science and the bodies that receive it. This exhibition was inaugurated in 2022 as part of the Circuit of Feminist Artistic Practices, an initiative of the Cultural Center of Spain in Costa Rica, an initiative of the Museo de las Mujeres and Casa Ma of Costa Rica and LL Proyectos of Honduras, with the that seeks to make the work of women artists visible, promote the insertion of women in the management of cultural spaces and activities and create inter-institutional alliances around feminist movements and it was also presented in 2023 at the CU Gallery of the Universidad de Costa Rica.

=== Queer art ===
Muñoz Brenes is co-coordinator of Curatorship at the Museum of Identity and Pride (MIO), the only museum in Central America with a LGBTIQ+ theme. From there, in 2021 she was the producer of the podcast Quiero Queer in collaboration with the Cultural Center of Spain in Costa Rica, in which 16 artists from the LGBTIQ+ community of Costa Rica were interviewed to address his intentions and background of his work as well as in a second season in 2022 with people over 50 to explore the socio-affective experiences of their youth.

In addition, she collaborated with the Spanish museum Museari in their mapping of queer artists from Costa Rica for the annual Museari Queer Art exhibition in 2021 and 2022, which included Costa Rican artists Andy Retana, Sussy Vargas Alvarado, Osvaldo Sequeira and Man Yu.

Also, she was the curator of the inaugural exhibition of the Spectro Gallery, founded in 2021 as a space for access to culture open to the LGBTIQ+ community and allies, in order to give visibility to the insufficiency of inclusive spaces focused on the arts in San José, Costa Rica. He also curated the virtual exhibition "Exist and resist in diversity", a sample of graffiti made at the University of Costa Rica on issues of sexual and gender diversity carried out in 2022, as a revision of the protest graphic for the direct indication of realities and concerns, the desire for change and personal and collective affirmation, the anonymous breaking of established rules and the dissemination of change, organized between the University of Costa Rica and the Museum of Identity and Pride.

=== Panero ===
In addition to standing out for her work in queer art and transfeminism, Muñoz Brenes is a specialist in Leopoldo María Panero studies. Her Bachelor's thesis in Psychology is a rereading from psychoanalysis and horror literature of parent-child relationships, based on the book "El lugar del hijo" by Leopoldo María Panero.
