= Iris Burgoyne =

Australian writer

Iris Burgoyne (born Yumadoo Kochallalya) was a South Australian author and Kokatha (Aboriginal) elder who spent many years on the native title advisory council.

She was inaugural chairwoman for the Port Lincoln Aboriginal Health Service.

She was born in 1936 at Koonibba Mission on the western Eyre Peninsula and after resettling and fostering many youth she died in 2014 in Port Lincoln.

== Bibliography ==
- The Mirning: We Are the Whales. Magabala Books. 2000. ISBN 9781875641567.

== Personal ==
Her grandson Shaun Burgoyne is a feted AFL footballer and another grandson, Peter Burgoyne, is a former AFL player.
