= Irıs =

Irıs Ырыс
- derevnya
- Location within Tatarstan
- Country: Russia
- Region: Tatarstan
- District: Menzelinsky District

Population (2010)
  - Total: 282
- Time zone: UTC+3:00

Irıs (Tatar: Ырыс, romanized: Irıs) is a rural locality (a derevnya) in Menzelinsky District, Tatarstan. The population was 282 as of 2010. Irıs is located 17 km from Menzelinsk, district's administrative centre, and 280 km from Kazan, republic's capital, by road. The earliest known record of the settlement dates from 1732. There are 2 streets in the village.
