= IRIS (biosensor) =

Interferometric reflectance imaging sensor (IRIS), formerly known as the spectral reflectance imaging biosensor (SRIB), is a system that can be used as a biosensing platform capable of high-throughput multiplexing of protein–protein, protein–DNA, and DNA–DNA interactions without the use of any fluorescent labels. The sensing surface is prepared by robotic spotting of biological probes that are immobilized on functionalized Si/SiO_{2} substrates. IRIS is capable of quantifying biomolecular mass accumulated on the surface.

== Measurement ==
To perform a measurement, the sample is illuminated with multiple different wavelengths from either a tunable laser or different color LEDs; typically speaking, a relatively narrow bandwidth optical source. The reflection intensity is imaged using a CCD or CMOS camera. By using interferometric techniques, nanometer changes can be detected.

== Applications ==
Applications for IRIS include microarray format immunoassays, single nucleotide polymorphism (SNP) detection, pathogen detection and bio-defense monitoring, kinetic analysis of biomolecular interactions, and general biomolecular interaction studies for research applications.
