= IRIS engine =

Design for a new type of internal combustion engine

The IRIS Engine is a design for a new type of internal combustion engine. Its inventors say that engines constructed using this design can be smaller, lighter and significantly more efficient than traditional engines of comparable horsepower and displacement. The design replaces the piston and cylinder architecture of conventional engines with a purportedly novel mechanism called the Internally Radiating Impulse Structure, or IRIS.

In January 2008, the IRIS Engine design won first prize for transportation technology in NASA's annual "Create the Future" design competition. In October 2008, the Radial Expansion Engine (RXE), a variant of the IRIS design, won second prize in the ConocoPhillips Energy Prize competition.

== Geometry of the IRIS ==
In an IRIS combustion chamber, a number of inverted segments of a circle, or "chordons," interact to create a continuously sealed chamber of variable volume. Instead of elongating during combustion, as a traditional engine does, the IRIS engine's chamber expands in diameter. The inventors claim that this innovation will reduce waste heat and will increase the amount of surface area the engine has available to produce torque.

== Design variations ==
IRIS engines are designed to run on traditional fuels, but could also be adapted to use biodiesel, natural gas, or hydrogen. IRIS chamber technology could also be utilized to create pumps, compressors and medical devices.

== Designers ==
The IRIS was conceived of by Timber Dick, a Denver, Colorado inventor and businessman. Three of his sons, Corban, Levi, and Tomicah Tillemann-Dick, also contributed to the design and are credited on patent applications relating to the IRIS engine. The design recently won the $20,000 Dow Sustainability Award. A closely related design by the same team of inventors, the Radial Expansion Engine, was awarded a $75,000 prize in the ConocoPhillips Energy Prize Competition.
