= Infrared interferometer spectrometer and radiometer =

An infrared interferometer spectrometer and radiometer (IRIS) is a scientific instrument of the Voyager space probes which enables the measurement of three distinct properties. The instrument itself consists of two separate instruments that together share a single large-aperture telescope system.

The Infrared interferometer spectrometer holds two functions as it can act as a thermometer and/or spectrometer. The thermometer allows for the observance and measurement of heat energy emitting from an object, and the spectrometer enables the identification of various elements, molecules, and compounds which may be present in an atmosphere and/or on the surface of a body. The separate radiometer allows for the measurement of reflected infrared, visible, and ultraviolet light off of a body.

== History ==
Early versions of the IRIS were flown on the 1960s Nimbus 3 and Nimbus 4. In 1971, an early prototype was used on Mariner 9 to examine Mars.

== Objectives ==
The instrument was included, primarily, to meet the following objectives.

- Determination of atmospheric vertical thermal structure (which in turn aids modeling of atmospheric dynamics).
- Measurement of the abundances of hydrogen and helium (as a check on theories regarding their ratio in the primitive solar nebula).
- Determination of the balance of energy radiated to that absorbed from the sun (to help investigate planetary origin, evolution, and internal processes).

== Discoveries ==
During the Voyager trip past Saturn, the IRIS discovered complex organic molecules in Titan's atmosphere. This discovery would be further examined by the Cassini-Huygens probe in 2005.
