= MATADOR =

Shoulder-launched anti-armour and anti-brickwall weapon

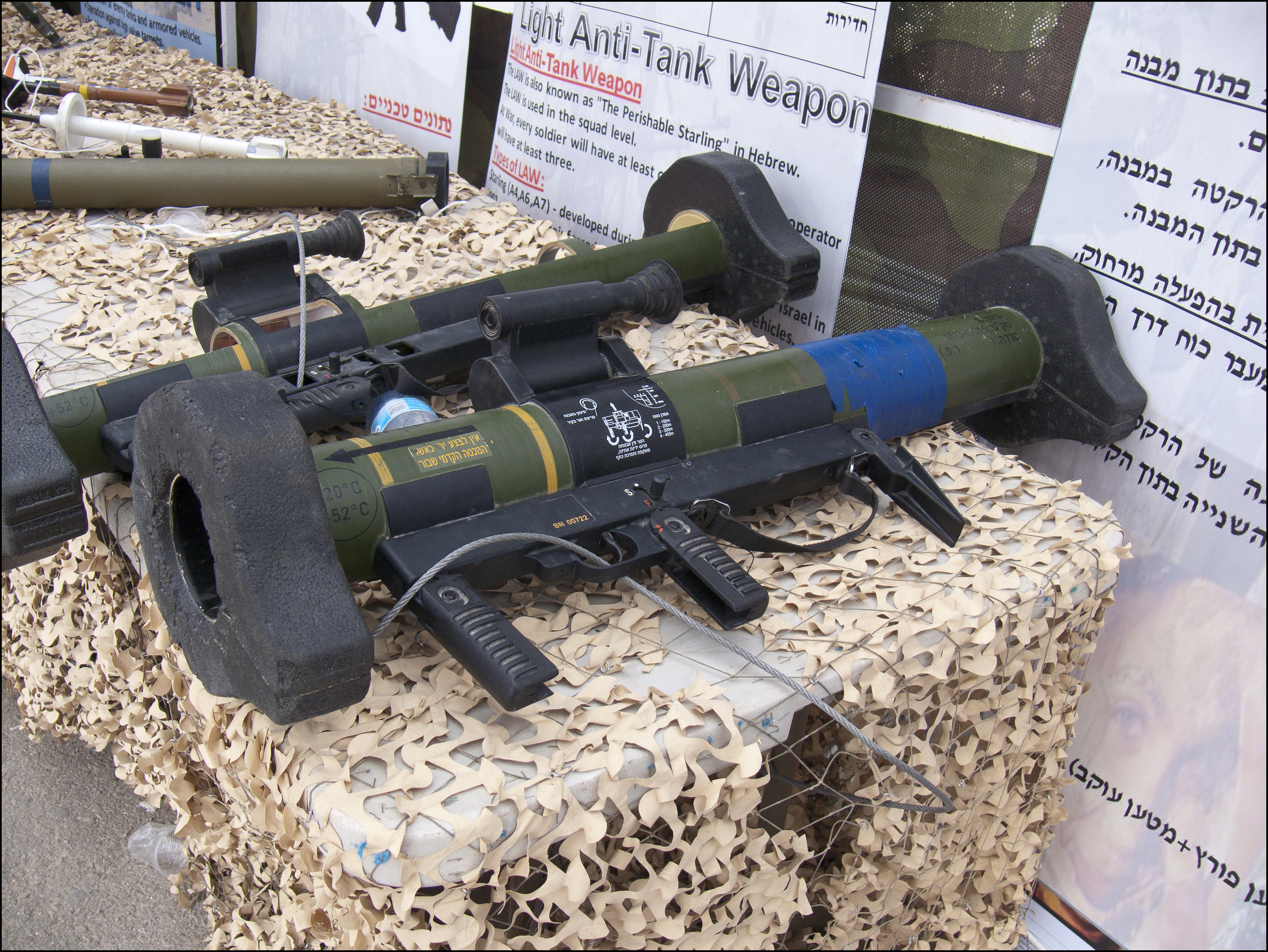
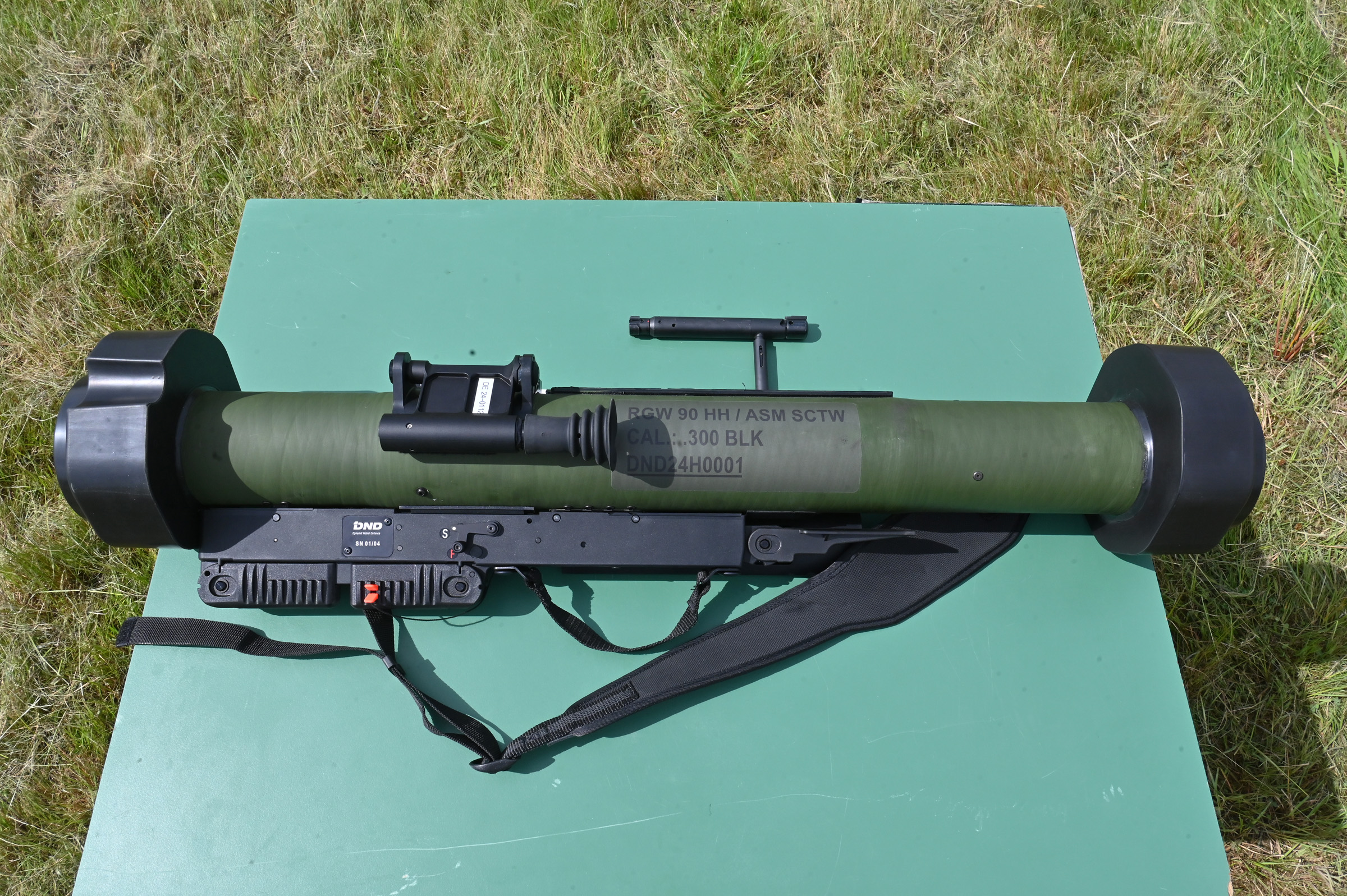
- Type: Recoilless gun
- Place of origin: Germany; Israel; Singapore

Service history
- In service: 2000–present
- Used by: See Operators
- Wars: Gaza War (2008–09); Russo-Ukrainian War; Russian invasion of Ukraine; Gaza war

Production history
- Designer: Singapore Armed Forces, Rafael Advanced Defense Systems, Defence Science and Technology Agency
- Designed: 1999
- Manufacturer: Dynamit Nobel Defence
- Unit cost: ~€5,000

Specifications
- Mass: 10.350 kg (22 lb 13.1 oz)
- Length: 1 m (3 ft 3 in)
- Caliber: 90 mm (3.5 in); 60 mm (2.4 in); 110 mm (4.3 in)
- Muzzle velocity: 250 m/s (820 ft/s)
- Effective firing range: 500 m (1,600 ft)
- Feed system: Single-shot, disposable
- Sights: Integral optical sights Night vision device on a Picatinny rail

The MATADOR (man-portable, anti-tank, anti-door) is a 90-millimetre (3.5 in) man-portable, disposable anti-armour and anti-brickwall weapon system developed by Germany, Israel and Singapore. It is an updated version of the German Armbrust design, and operates on the same principles. The development of this weapon began in 2000 and the MATADOR will eventually replace the German Armbrust Light Anti-tank Weapon, which has been in service since the 1980s.

The MATADOR was developed jointly by the Singapore Armed Forces (SAF) and the Defence Science and Technology Agency (DSTA), in collaboration with Rafael Advanced Defense Systems and Dynamit Nobel Defence (DND) joint team.

== Design ==
=== Warhead ===
The warhead can be used in both high-explosive anti-tank (HEAT) and high explosive squash head (HESH) modes against armour, walls, or other fortifications respectively. Modes are selected by adjusting a probe (most likely a fuse extender): extending it for HEAT mode and leaving it retracted for HESH mode.

The warhead is effective against both vehicle armour and brick walls. The weapon has little back-blast, making it safe for operation in confined spaces.

=== Counter-mass system ===
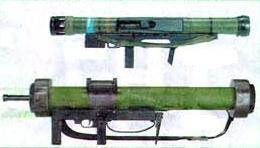
Comparing the Armbrust (top) and MATADOR (bottom).

Similar to the Armbrust, the counter-mass counteracts the recoil of the weapon upon firing. The counter-mass consists of shredded plastic, which is launched out of the rear of the weapon when it is fired. This plastic is rapidly slowed by air resistance, allowing the weapon to be fired safely within an enclosed space. In addition, the positioning of the counter-mass takes into consideration the centre of gravity of the weapon to ensure good balance for better accuracy.

== Variants ==
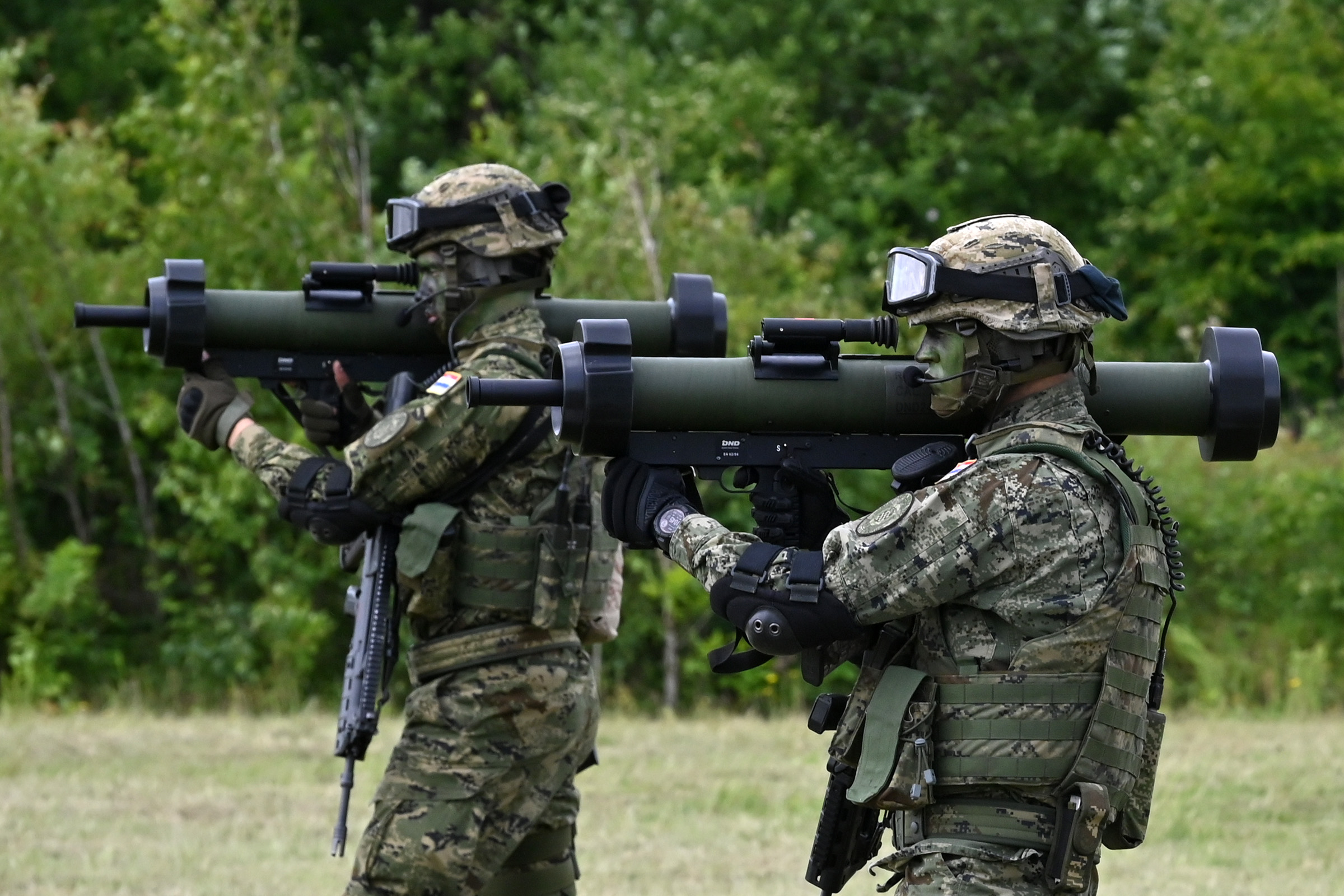
Croatian army soldiers with RGW 90

Variants of the original HEAT/HESH (HH) weapon have been developed by Rafael and Dynamit Nobel Defence, designed primarily for anti-structure use by soldiers operating in dense urban environments.

MATADOR-MP
Multi-purpose variant. As with the initial MATADOR, this is achieved with a dual-mode fuse, which has been improved on the MATADOR-MP such that it now automatically discriminates between hard and soft targets rather than requiring the operator to manually make the selection. A dedicated targeting device, mounted on its Picatinny rail, incorporates a reflex sight and laser rangefinder to provide a high hit probability.

MATADOR-WB
Specialised wall-breaching weapon, featuring an explosively-formed ring (EFR) warhead that breaches a man-sized hole, between 75 cm (30 in) to 100 cm (39 in) across, in typical urban walls.

MATADOR-AS
Anti-structure weapon with an advanced tandem warhead that can also be set between two modes. The anti-emplacement mode uses an enhanced blast effect to defeat structures and fortifications, while the penetrating/mouse-holing mode defeats light armoured vehicles and creates mouseholes in urban walls. MATADOR-AS has been ordered by the British Army, and was slated for service entry in 2009.

RGW
RGW 90 is a German designation for the MATADOR, with "RGW" standing for "recoilless grenade weapon". The RGW 60 is a variant that is smaller and fires a 60 mm warhead, instead of the usual 90 mm.

== Combat history ==
- The MATADOR saw its first combat deployment in January 2009, by Israel Defence Forces soldiers during Operation Cast Lead in the Gaza Strip. MATADOR-AS was used to breach walls in structures, allowing IDF troops to pass through and attack opponents inside.
- In 2022, Ukrainian forces used MATADORs supplied by Germany against Russian forces during the 2022 Russian invasion of Ukraine.
- According to reports from Ukraine, the RGW-90 is capable of penetrating lightly armoured APCs and IFVs, but not guaranteed to easily defeat tank reactive armour. “This summer, the soldiers of the 93rd Brigade fired RGW90 into the forehead of a Russian tank with reactive armor. The tank was not destroyed, but it was stopped, and soldiers who were on the top of the tank got minced,” the military stated.
- The MATADOR is seeing extensive usage in the Gaza war with numerous filmed clips of it being fired according to its Israeli main designation as a means to burst concrete obstacles.

== Operators ==
Map with MATADOR operators in blue

=== Current operators ===
Belgium
In 2013, made order for 111 RGW90 AS, 509 in 2016, 390 in 2018 1450 delivered in 2020. In January 2022, Belgian Ministry of Defence made a €19 million order for several batches of RGW90, which were to be delivered before the year ends, 4002 were reported to be exported at the end of 2022.

Croatia
On 18 January 2023, documents were released that the army plans on ordering an unknown number of RGW90s worth €3 million. According to footage published by magazine Croatian soldier on social media, system is currently used in regular training.

Germany
Variants used:
- The German Army has ordered 1,000 MATADOR-AS under the name RGW90 AS with scalable anti-structure munition.
- The German Army also uses the LRMP version (range: 1,200 meters) under the designation "Wirkmittel 90".
- In late 2020, the German Army ordered 3,000 cartridges in different munition types for the Wirkmittel 90.
- Germany also ordered the 1,087 RGW60 for its Special Forces in 2020 (689 RGW 60 HEAT known as DM 52 and 398 RGW 60 HESH known as DM 62).

Israel
The Israel Defense Forces and the Israeli Police's YAMAM national counter-terror unit use the RGW 90.

Kosovo
The Minister of Defence ordered up to 1000 RGW 90 for the Kosovo Security Force in 2023, with deliveries planned for 2024-2025.

Mexico
The RGW60 variant has first seen in September 2018. Around 3,000 units were ordered.

Singapore
The MATADOR replaced the Armbrust in the Singapore Armed Forces.
- 4,780 delivered in 2020.

Slovenia
The Slovenian Ground Force, use the RGW 90.

Switzerland
8,000 delivered in 2018.

Ukraine
- The Armed Forces of Ukraine bought 5,100 units with the first batch of 2,650 units received on 26 March 2022, and 2,450 remaining units were to be delivered in smaller batches by the end of May 2022 to support its fight against Russia in the Russian invasion of Ukraine.
- 16,000 RGW 90 were donated by Germany as of 17 October 2024.
- Over 2,600 Anti-Structure Munitions (ASM), donated by the United Kingdom since February 2022.

United Kingdom
British Army ordered the Anti-Structures Munition (ASM) version of the MATADOR from Dynamit Nobel Defence.
- No longer in service after all were donated to Ukraine in 2022.

Vietnam
Used by the Vietnam People's Navy's Infantry.

=== Failed bids ===
United States
The RGW 60 and RGW 90 lost a competition against the AT4CS TW for the US Army XM919 programme for a new Individual Assault Munition.

== Incidents ==
In December 2022 one was discharged by Polish police general commandant Jarosław Szymczyk inside his office at National Police Headquarters.

In October 2024, shrapnel from this weapon was found in the corpse of Hamas leader Yahya Sinwar in Tal al-Sultan, an area of Rafah within the Gaza Strip.

== See also ==
- List of rocket launchers
- List of anti-tank missiles
- Alcotán-100 – (Spain)
- Armbrust – (West Germany)
- B-300 – (Israel)
- Panzerfaust 3 – (West Germany)
- PzF 44 – (West Germany)
- RGW 110
