= Iris Parush =

Israeli scholar

Iris Parush (Hebrew: איריס פרוש) is an Israeli scholar of Hebrew literature. Parush's work includes the study of the cultural and ideological development of Haskalah literature as well as the impact of nationalist ideologies on modern Hebrew literature.

== Background ==
Iris Parush is a professor of Hebrew literature at Ben Gurion University.

== Publications ==
=== Books ===
- Reading Jewish Women: Marginality and Modernization in Nineteenth-Century Eastern European Jewish Society (Brandeis University Press, 2004)
- Sin of Writing and the Rise of Modern Hebrew Literature (Palgrave Macmillan, 2021)

== Selected articles ==
- Parush, I. (1997). Women readers as agents of social change among Eastern European Jews in the late nineteenth century. Gender & History, 9(1), 60-82.
- Parush, I., & Brener, A. (1995). The Politics of Literacy: Women and Foreign Languages in Jewish Society of 19th-Century Eastern Europe. Modern Judaism, 183-206.
- Parush, I., & Sternberg, S. (2004). Another Look at "The Life of 'Dead' Hebrew": Intentional Ignorance of Hebrew in Nineteenth-Century Eastern European Jewish Society. Book History, 7(1), 171-214.

== Awards ==
- Zalman Shazar Prize for Jewish History

== See also ==
- Menachem Brinker, Parush's doctoral advisor
