= IRIS (jamming device) =

Family of jamming devices

IRIS is a family of ECM equipment developed by Estonian Defence Forces for purposes of interfering with remotely controlled explosive devices. In June 2009, the technology, manufactured by E-Arsenal, was sold to Latvian Army in unpublished numbers, unpublished configuration, unpublished delivery time at unpublished price.

== Family members ==
There are three members in the IRIS family:

- IRIS-T/V is a high-powered vehicle-mounted ECM device;
- IRIS-T/MO is a low-power device carriable by patrolling infantry;
- IRIS-I/IMP is a device for measuring the jamming intensity at particular locations.
