= USS Shiloh (1865) =

History

United States
- Name: USS Shiloh
- Ordered: 24 June 1863
- Builder: Charles W. mccord, St. Louis, Missouri
- Launched: 14 July 1865
- Commissioned: 17 September 1874
- Decommissioned: 5 October 1874
- Fate: Sold, 1874

General characteristics
- Class & type: Casco-class monitor
- Displacement: 1,175 long tons (1,194 t)
- Length: 225 ft (69 m)
- Beam: 45 ft (14 m)
- Draft: 9 ft (2.7 m)
- Propulsion: Screw steamer
- Speed: 9 knots (10 mph; 17 km/h)
- Complement: 60 officers and enlisted
- Armament: 2 × 11 in (280 mm) smoothbore Dahlgren guns
- Armor: Turret: 8 in (200 mm); Pilothouse: 10 in (250 mm); Hull: 3 in (76 mm); Deck: 3 in (76 mm)

USS Shiloh was a single-turreted, twin-screw monitor that was slated to enter service with the United States Navy. The contract for her construction was awarded on 24 June 1863 to George C. Bestor of Peoria, Illinois. Her keel was laid down later that year at the yard of Charles W. mccord of St. Louis, Missouri. However, while Shiloh was still under construction, USS Chimo, one of the first of the Casco-class monitors to be launched, was found to be unseaworthy.

== Design revisions ==
Though the original designs for the Casco-class monitors were drawn by John Ericsson, the final revision was created by Chief Engineer Alban C. Stimers following Rear Admiral Samuel F. Du Pont's failed bombardment of Fort Sumter in 1863. By the time that the plans were put before the Monitor Board in New York City, Ericsson and Stimers had a poor relationship, and Chief of the Bureau of Construction and Repair John Lenthall had little connection to the board. This resulted in the plans being approved and 20 vessels ordered without serious scrutiny of the new design. US$14 million was allocated for the construction of these vessels. It was discovered that Stimers had failed to compensate for the armor his revisions added to the original plan and this resulted in excessive stress on the wooden hull frames and a freeboard of only 3 inches (76 mm). Stimers was removed from the control of the project and Ericsson was called in to undo the damage. He was forced to raise the hulls of the monitors under construction by 22 inches (560 mm) to make them seaworthy.

On 25 June 1864, the Navy Department ordered Shiloh's builder to raise her deck to give her sufficient freeboard, then on 17 June 1865, after the end of the Civil War had prompted an American naval retrenchment, work on Shiloh was ordered suspended. Nevertheless, it was decided to proceed with her launching; and an unsuccessful attempt to get her off the ways was made on 3 July 1865. After much labor, the ship finally entered the water 11 days later.

== Fate ==
Shiloh saw no service before being laid up in 1866 at Mound City, Illinois. On 15 June 1869, she was renamed USS Iris. In the same year, she was moved to New Orleans and laid up there. On 17 September 1874, the monitor was commissioned; but she saw no significant service before she was decommissioned on 5 October 1874 and again laid up at New Orleans on 15 October 1874. She was sold later that year.

== Bibliography ==
- Roberts, William H. (2002): Civil War Ironclads: Industrial Mobilization for the US Navy 1861–1865, Johns Hopkins University Press, ISBN 0-8018-6830-0
