= Iris Peterson =

American flight attendant (1921–2025)

- Born: October 11, 1921; Menan, Idaho, U.S.
- Died: November 17, 2025 (aged 104)
- Occupation: Flight attendant
- Known for: Flight attendant #1 in terms of seniority
- Spouse: Raymond Copin (died 2024)

Iris Vidaillet Peterson (October 11, 1921 – November 17, 2025) was an American flight attendant who flew for United Airlines for 60 years between 1946 and 2007. At the time of her retirement at the age of 85, she was #1 in terms of seniority.

== Life and career ==
Iris V. Peterson was born in Menan, Idaho, on October 11, 1921. She began her career in 1946. She held various leadership positions in the flight attendants' union. In 1953, she became the first lobbyist for the Air Line Stewards and Stewardesses Association. In 1968, she helped develop safety plans for the first jumbo jets. Working with aircraft engineers, 17 safety items were accepted, including the evacuation alarm, now standard equipment on aircraft worldwide. As of 1995 Peterson had the second highest seniority among flight attendants with United. She retired on April 23, 2007 after a 60-year career, and held the world record for longest flight attendant career until 2012 when Ron Akana retired after 62 years.

When she started her career, job restrictions included age, gender, ethnicity, and weight, which favored men and discriminated against women. A tribute to Peterson by the United Airlines Association of Flight Attendants notes that she and her peers helped to destroy discriminatory practices, advancing the rights of women and uprooting gender discrimination (example flight attendants' right to be married, which wasn't allowed until 1968).

As of October 2021, Peterson lived in Redmond, Washington. Her husband, Raymond, predeceased her in March 2024. Peterson died on November 17, 2025, at the age of 104.
