= Man Yu =

Costa Rican artist

- Born: Man Yu Fung Li; February 19, 1978 (age 48); Kowloon, Hong Kong
- Occupation: Artist
- Years active: 2005-present
- Notable work: Human Suit
- Movement: Contemporary realism Contemporary art
- Website: manyuart.com

Man Yu Fung Li (born February 19, 1978), commonly known as Man Yu, is a Costa Rican artist, born in Hong Kong. She specializes in painting, but also incorporates multiple multidisciplinary media such as installation art, video art and performance art. Part of her work focuses on human anatomy, the different non-physical layers of the human being, humanism and respect for living beings.

Her artworks can be found in the permanent collections of the Hanwei International Arts Center, Beijing, and Museo Nacional de Costa Rica, San José.

== Biography and artistic career ==
=== Early life and education ===
Man Yu was born in Kowloon City, Hong Kong, on February 19, 1978. She is the daughter of Pik Luen Li Kan and Tak Fu Fung Ng, who fought in World War II. The family immigrated to Costa Rica, which Man Yu's father selected because of its lack of army.

Man Yu grew up in San José, Costa Rica, and attended primary school at the Catholic Active School. She has spoken about her childhood experiences of bullying and how this inspired her to explore self-expression through art and writing.

Man Yu later enrolled in Universidad VERITAS to study advertising design. However, she discontinued studies in 1999 when she became pregnant at the age of 21. After experiencing a number of life stressors, Man Yu returned to the practice of art. She studied under Nelly Eyo, an Argentine artist, exploring painting, pastel, and the human figure. She also was a student of Julio Escámez for several years, learning about oil painting in his workshop.

=== Women of the Orient ===
By 2005, Man Yu had completed her first collection of works, titled Women of the Orient, with 10 large-format works in pastel that referred to the symbolism, color, and mysticism of Asian culture, and specifically exemplification of Asian women. In addition to approach the aesthetic from figurativism, concepts such as motherhood, nostalgia, marriage and women in general are addressed too. The series combines Japanese geishas and Chinese operas with Man Yu's explicit purpose of reflecting that despite the insistence of the Japanese and Chinese people to differentiate themselves and not be confused together, the essence of femininity in their traditions and allegorical aesthetics are similar and projected to the West where they are received with the same cultural perception.

This collection was exhibited for the first time in 2016 as a solo exhibition in the 1887 Gallery of the National Center for Culture in Costa Rica. This was Man Yu's first exhibition experience and she opened the exhibition as a Chinese festival with food and lion dancing. The pieces in the collection were also exhibited at the Confucius Institute in Costa Rica.

=== Traje Humano (Human Suit) ===
Inspired by a childhood painting, Man Yu decided to start a new series of works, Traje Humano (Human Suit). The multimedia series includes 28 works painted between 2013 and 2019 (added to her original 1987 painting from childhood), two installations, and several multidisciplinary artistic collaborations that involved video, performance, fashion design, videomapping and happenings with 33 other artists from various disciplines. Her collaborators included video artists, dancers, musicians, and fashion designers.

Costa Rica's Minister of Culture Sylvie Durán and the President of the Republic Carlos Alvarado declared the exhibition to be of national cultural interest. The exhibit appeared at the Museo Nacional de Costa Rica, the Municipal Museum of Cartago, the Arts Center of the Costa Rica Institute of Technology, the Cultural Center of Spain, the Beijing World Art Museum, and the Women's Museum of Costa Rica.

The last work of the Human Suit circuit, executed on August 30, 2019, earned considerable media attention. The performance/happening I'm Not This Suit involved around 100 naked people, as commentary on the stigmas and social conditioning of the burdens ("trajines" in spanish) that each person lives with in their human suits. The performance was the first massive public artistic nude in the Central American region.

According to the Latin American art magazine Hypermedia Magazine, the Traje Humano project caught the attention of the Costa Rican and Central American art scene, not only because it was the first time that so many artists joined to expand the work of a single living artist and for making of the first massive nude public in the region, but also because it set a precedent in the cultural management of the region by also involving for the first time a wide portfolio of public, private and independent collaborators who supported a project of social and humanistic public exhibition with art.

== Awards and recognition ==
Man Yu was part of the team that won the award for best short film at the 2019 European International Film Festival, for No. 77873B. Her work was declared by the Costa Rican government to be of national cultural interest. She represented Costa Rica at the Beijing International Art Biennale of 2017 and the Latin American Art Festival in Beijing in 2019. In 2019, she was selected to represent Costa Rica in a series of official China Post commemorative envelopes.

== Public collections ==
- Hanwei International Arts Center, China
- Costa Rica National Gallery, Costa Rica
- Ministry of Culture, China
- China Post, China
- Juan Santamaría Airport, Costa Rica
- National Bank of Costa Rica, Costa Rica
- Chamber of Commerce of Costa Rica, Costa Rica
