= Iris (color) =

Ambiguous color term

Color coordinates
- Hex triplet: #5A4FCF
- sRGB^{B} (r, g, b): (90, 79, 207)
- HSV (h, s, v): (245°, 62%, 81%)
- CIELCh_{uv} (L, C, h): (42, 98, 268°)
- Source: ColorHexa
- B: Normalized to [0–255] (byte)

Iris flowers

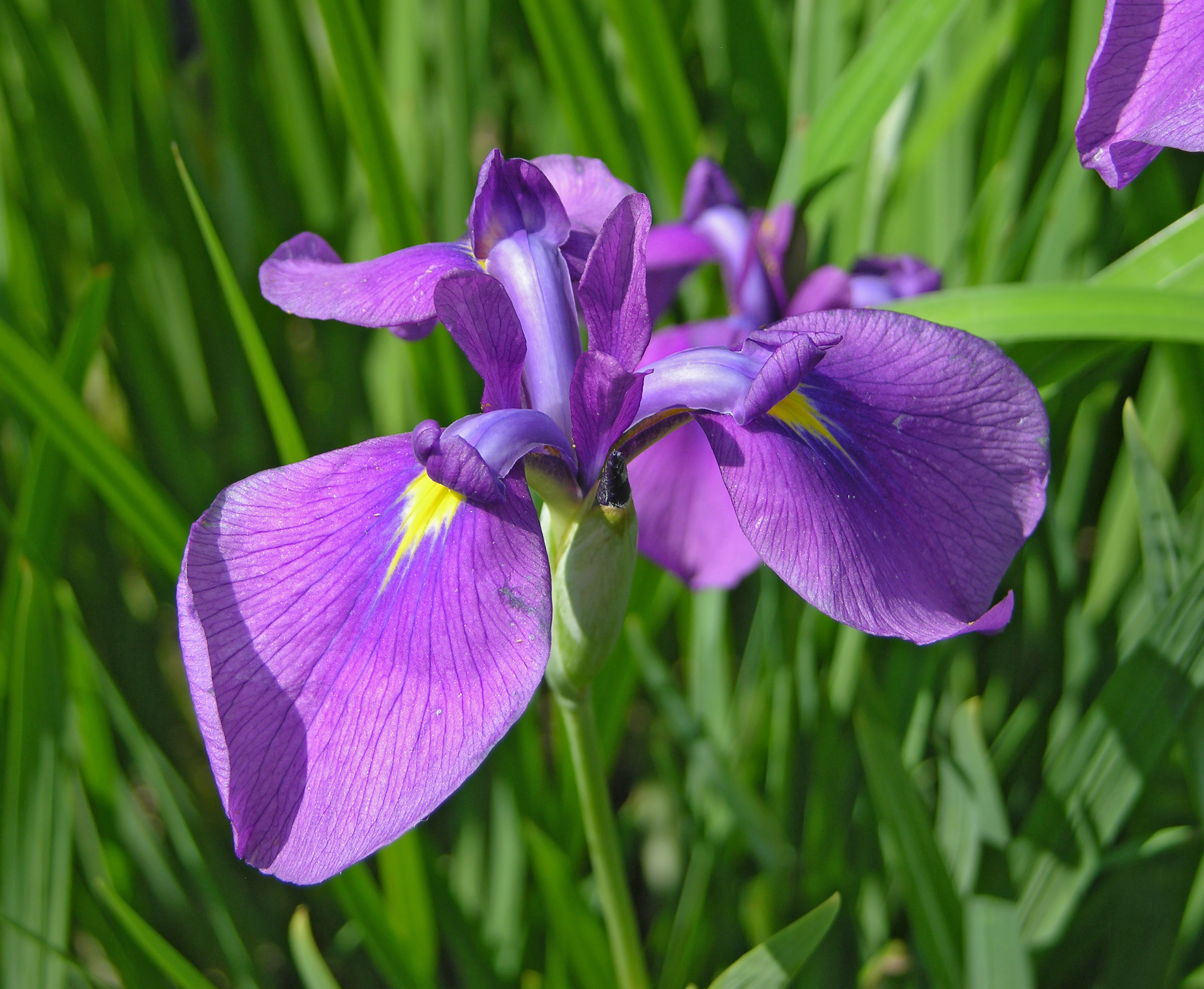
An iris flower in the Chanticleer Garden in Pennsylvania

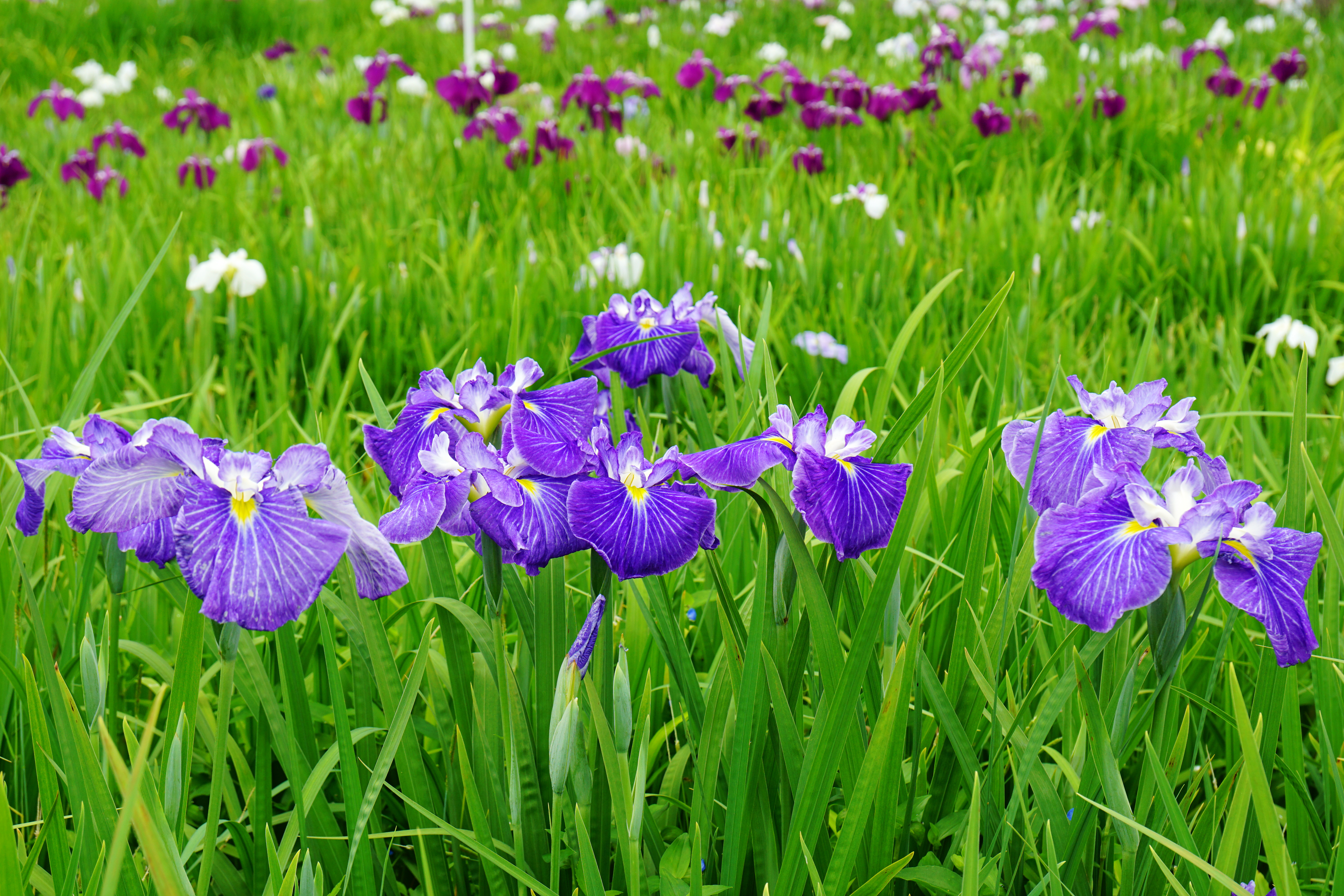
The Yagyu Iris Garden in Nara, Japan

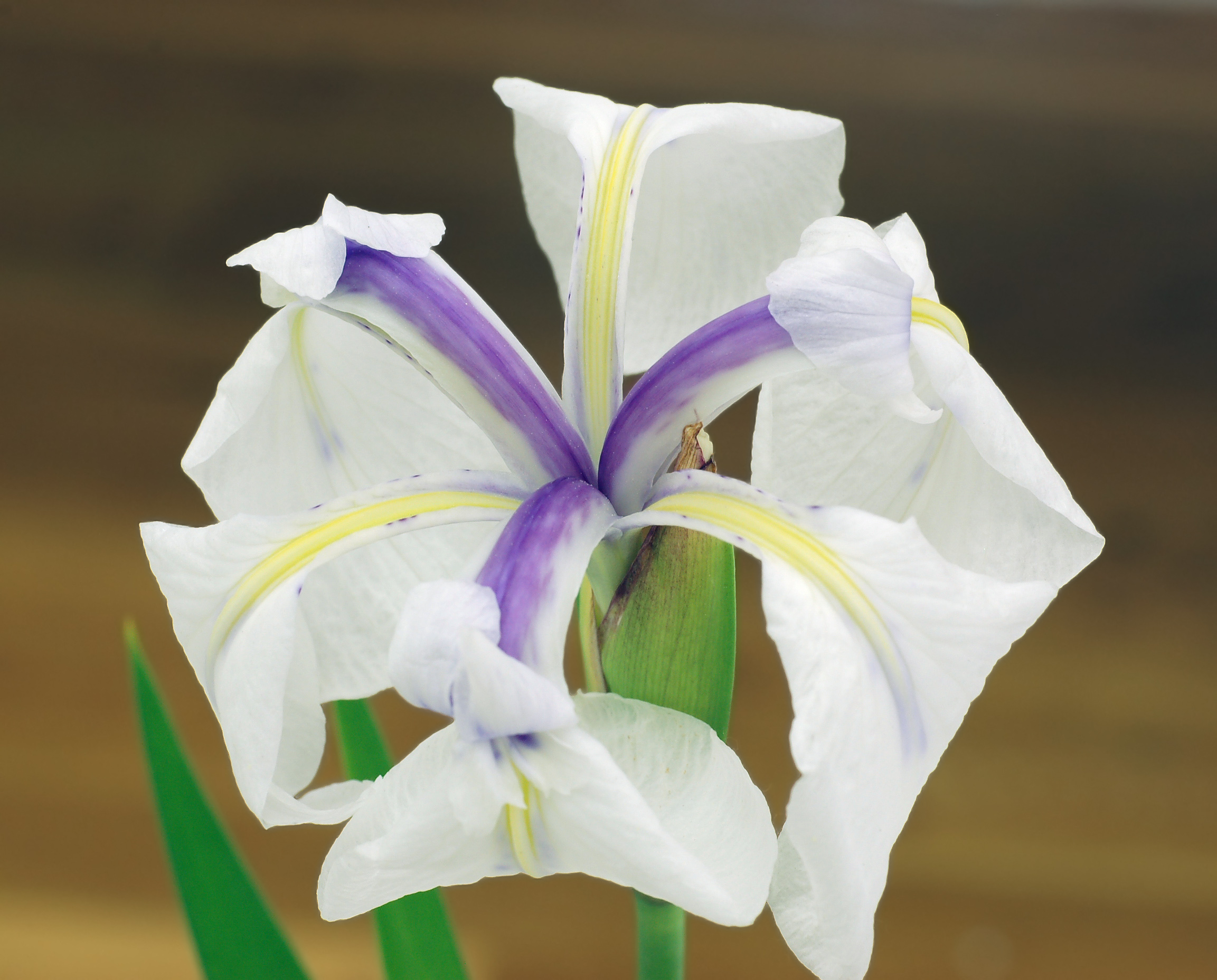
The taxonomical name of this Rabbitear Iris is Iris laevigata

The iris genus contains 260–300 species of flower, many of them of blue and purple shades.

Iris is an ambiguous color term, usually referring to shades ranging from blue-violet to violet.

However, in certain applications, it has been applied to an even wider array of colors, including pale blue, mauve, pink, and even yellow (the color of the inner part of the iris flower).

The name is derived from the iris flower, which comes in a broad spectrum of colors.

The first recorded use of iris as a color name in English was in the year 1916.

== See also ==
- Iris (disambiguation)
- List of colors
