= Iris Le Feuvre =

Jersey politician

Iris Le Feuvre MBE
- Born: Iris Renouf; 9 October 1928; St Martin, Jersey
- Died: 2 August 2022 (aged 93)

Iris Le Feuvre MBE (née Renouf, 9 October 1928 – 2 August 2022) was a Jersey politician who served in the States of Jersey and was active in community work in Jersey.

== Biography ==
Iris Medora Le Feuvre was born in the Parish of Saint Martin, Jersey. She was educated at St Peter Elementary School, and then at the States Intermediate School.

During the German Occupation of Jersey (1940-1945), her family hid a Russian prisoner of war, and fed and sheltered him for the duration.

She was employed as a bookkeeper between 1945 and 1948 when she met and married Eric G. Le Feuvre, a St Lawrence farmer.

A committed Methodist, she helped with the inception of the Communicare project.

=== States of Jersey ===
She was elected Deputy for the Parish of St Lawrence from 1978 to 1981, and 1984 to 1999 was Connétable of St. Lawrence. She was the first woman to be elected Connétable.

During this time she was President of the Education Committee, and oversaw the replacement of the decaying d'Hautree School with the building of Haute Vallée School.

=== Retirement ===
She retired from the States in 1999, but remained active in community work.

In 2002, she received an MBE for services to the community in Jersey. In 2003, she headed a group producing a report on Jersey's ageing population. In the same year, she also headed the Co-ordinating Committee for the Eradication of Poverty in Jersey, which noted that 2,000 young people were living in cramped and inappropriate accommodation.

In 2005, she was the fifth person voted by Islanders to be the subject of the Jersey Heritage Trust's portrait of a Jersey citizen.

In 2006, she supported the appeal by Save Jersey's Heritage to save Plémont headland for development, stating that "As Islanders our coastline defines us and as its custodians it is our duty to protect it for those yet to come."

== Death ==
She died on 2 August 2022, aged 93.

== Sources ==
- Jersey Evening Post
- BBC News
- Election Manifesto
- Who's Who in the Channel Islands
