= Viper Jaws pistol =

Viper JAWS Pistol
- Type: Pistol
- Place of origin: Jordan; United States

Service history
- Used by: See "Users"

Production history
- Designer: Wildey Moore & Jordan Design and Development Bureau
- Manufacturer: Jordan Design and Development Bureau
- Produced: 2005–present

Specifications (unknown)
- Mass: 2 kg
- Length: 250 m
- Barrel length: 200 mm
- Width: 139 mm
- Height: 200 mm
- Barrels: 127 mm
- Action: Rotating Barrel
- Maximum firing range: 250 m
- Feed system: 17 round magazine
- Sights: Iron Sights

The Viper Jaws pistol is a heavy duty single- and double-action pistol made in Jordan by Jordan Design and Development Bureau (JODDB, formerly King Abdullah II Design and Development Bureau) and designed by American citizen Wildey Moore, designer of the Wildey pistol. It is also the standard-issue pistol for the Jordanian armed forces, hence another designation—JAWS, or Jordan Arms & Weapons System

== Design details ==
The Viper JAWS is a solid and well made pistol with several interesting features, such as simple and robust design and modular construction. It can be easily reconfigured for several pistol calibers simply by replacing the barrel, breech face insert, the extractor and the magazine. This reconfiguration, as well as the performance of a standard field-stripping procedure, requires no tools. Grip panels may also be easily replaced with parts from another unit, even those with different shape or dimensions.

The Viper contains a short recoil-operated, locked breech pistol with rotating barrel. On recoil, barrel rotates to unlock from the slide, by following the curved track on the frame. The double-action trigger with its linkage is easily accessible for maintenance and cleaning via a removable side plate. The ambidextrous safety lever is located on both sides of the slide and also acts as a decocker when safety is engaged. Both front and rear sight are dovetailed into the slide and can be easily changed if required.

== Users ==
- Iraq
- Jordan
