= Iris Vianey Mendoza =

Mexican politician and lawyer (born 1981)

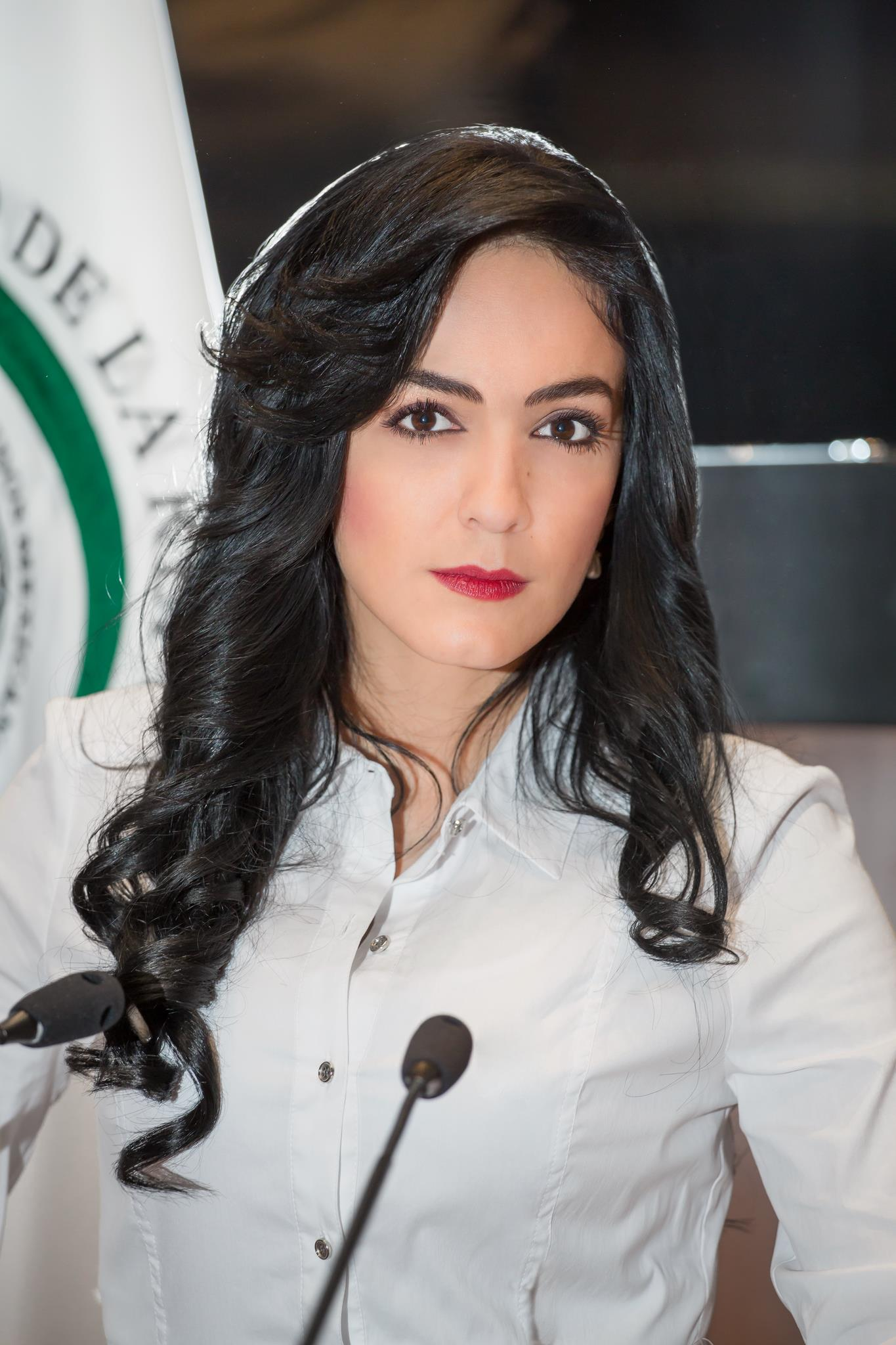
- Born: 26 August 1981 (age 45); Apatzingán, Michoacán, Mexico
- Education: Universidad Michoacana de San Nicolás de Hidalgo
- Occupation: Senator
- Political party: PRD

Iris Vianey Mendoza Mendoza (born 26 August 1981) is a Mexican politician and lawyer affiliated with the PRD. She currently serves as Senator of the LXII Legislature of the Mexican Congress.

== Political positions ==
She wants to fight and more penalize the violence in her country (crime, feminicides...) and help the families of the victims.
