= Iris, West Virginia =

Iris
- Unincorporated community
- Location within the state of West Virginia Iris (the United States)
- Coordinates: 39°2′1″N 81°3′18″W
- Country: United States
- State: West Virginia
- County: Ritchie
- Elevation: 1,109 ft (338 m)
- Time zone: UTC-5 (Eastern (EST))
  - Summer (DST): UTC-4 (EDT)
- GNIS ID: 1688988

Iris was an unincorporated community in Ritchie County, West Virginia.
