= IRIS Research =

Australian research organisation

- Founded: 1980
- Headquarters: Wollongong, Australia
- Website: iris.org.au

The Illawarra Regional Information Service, commonly called IRIS Research or IRIS, is an Australian research organisation that specialises in economic, community and industry research for government, business and academic institutions. IRIS Research commenced operations in 1980 and is headquartered in Wollongong, New South Wales.

== History ==
The original idea of a regional information service for the Illawarra was first proposed in 1977. With the help of the University of Wollongong, Wollongong City Council, Shellharbour City Council and the Government of New South Wales, the Illawarra Regional Information Service commenced operations in July 1980. Its primary responsibility was to provide sufficient information to enhance the economic and social development of the region.

Since that time, the activities of IRIS Research have spread across Australia. IRIS Research currently conducts projects for over 40 local councils across New South Wales and Queensland, a range of State government and Federal government departments and major private sector organisations such as BHP, BlueScope, IMB Bank and the WIN Corporation.

When IRIS Research began in 1980, it was Australia's first computer-based information service. A practice that has since become standard in research companies nationwide.

== Services Provided ==
=== Market & Social Research ===
IRIS Research conducts both market and social research. The contract research provided is tailored to the client's specific needs and can be both qualitative and quantitative. The organisation interprets raw data and draws implications for social and marketing strategy. IRIS Research conducts all fieldwork services in-house in its IQCA accredited Computer Assisted Telephone Interviewing facility. The organisation also runs focus groups, in-depth interviews and online surveys.

=== Local Government & Community Consultation ===
IRIS Research has had extensive experience in research and consultancy for local government. It specialises in social and strategic planning, local government specialisation, economic analysis, tourism, regional development and skills audits. This long history has helped IRIS Research to become the leading research organisation for local governments in Australia.

=== Regional Statistics ===
IRIS Research conducts a number of economic analyses for regions across Australia. Through surveys, data series and intimate knowledge of the local economy, IRIS Research is able to provide feasibility, market potential and economic impact statements for each region.
