= Glen Iris =

Glen Iris may refer to:

- Glen Iris, Victoria, a suburb of Melbourne
  - Glen Iris railway station
- Glen Iris, Western Australia, a suburb of Bunbury
- Glen Iris Estate, owned by William Pryor Letchworth
- Village at Glen Iris, Houston
