= Anti-Structures Munition =

British program to develop shoulder-launched weapon to destroy structures

The Anti-Structures Munition is a developmental program for the British Army to provide a man-portable shoulder-launched weapon capable of destroying hardened structures such as buildings or bunkers.

== Program status ==
- May 2004 - Systems from Dynamit Nobel and Saab Bofors Dynamics selected for competition.
- February 2006 - Contract (£40m) awarded to Dynamit Nobel Defence for production of the Anti-Structures Munition (ASM) version of the MATADOR.

July 2019 - The UK is in the process of awarding a new contract of the Anti-Structures Munition.

== Specifications ==
- Range: 500 m
- Warhead: "Enhanced blast warhead technology"

== See also ==
- MATADOR (weapon)
- Panzerfaust 3
