= Abraham Iris =

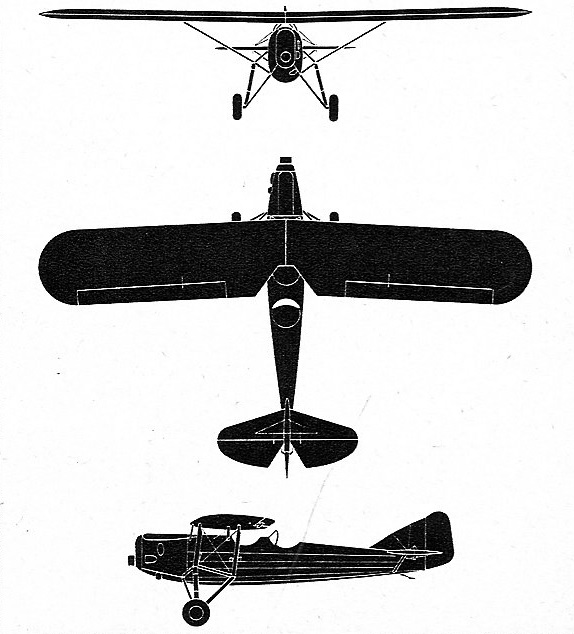

General information
- Type: Touring aircraft
- Manufacturer: Abraham

History
- Manufactured: 1930s

The Abraham Iris was a two-seat touring airplane produced in France in the early 1930s in two slightly different versions, the Iris I with a 75 kW (100 hp) Hispano-Suiza piston engine, and the Iris II with a Renault engine. The Iris was a conventional parasol wing monoplane with a neatly faired-in engine.

== Specifications (Iris II) ==
Data from Aviafrance : Abraham AS-2 'Iris' II

General characteristics

- Crew: 2
- Length: 6.87 m (22 ft 6 in)
- Wingspan: 9.8 m (32 ft 2 in)
- Height: 2.5 m (8 ft 2 in)
- Empty weight: 467 kg (1,030 lb)
- Gross weight: 760 kg (1,676 lb)
- Powerplant: 1 × Renault 4Pb 4-cylinder air-cooled in-line piston engine, 71 kW (95 hp)
- Propellers: 2-bladed fixed-pitch propeller

Performance

- Maximum speed: 180 km/h (110 mph, 97 kn)
- Range: 400 km (250 mi, 220 nmi)
- Wing loading: 51 kg/m^{2} (10 lb/sq ft)
- Power/mass: 0.099 kW/kg (0.06 hp/lb)
