= Desert Iris =

4x4 auxiliary vehicle

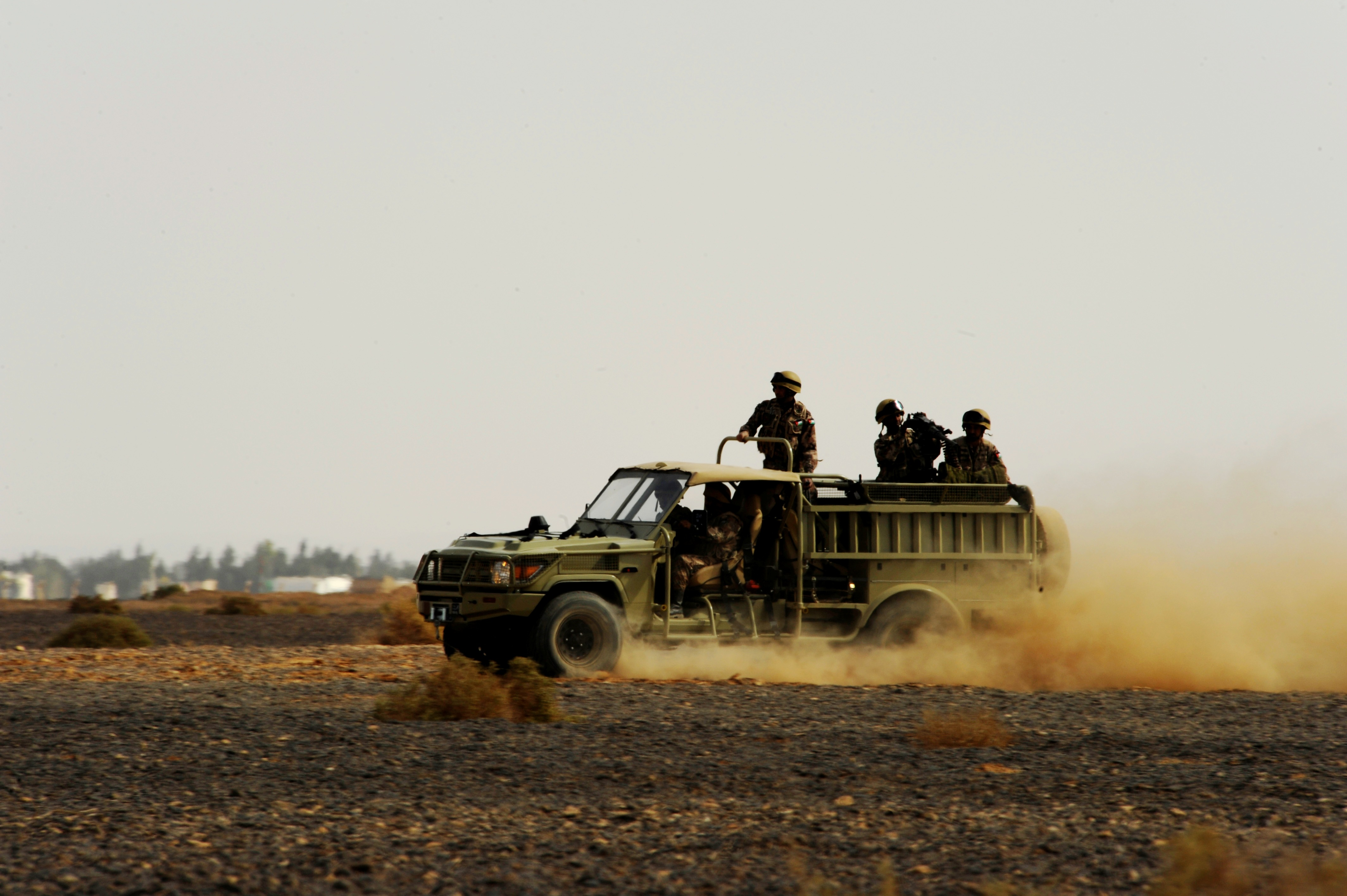
- Type: Auxiliary Vehicle
- Place of origin: Jordan

Service history
- In service: 2005-Present
- Used by: Jordan, UAE, Saudi Arabia, Libya, United Nations

Production history
- Designed: 1999-2001
- Manufacturer: King Abdullah Design and Development Bureau

Specifications
- Mass: 1650kg
- Length: 4250mm
- Width: 1900mm
- Height: 1750mm
- Crew: 4
- Transmission: Manual
- Operational range: 600km

The Desert Iris is a 4x4 versatile and durable strategic auxiliary vehicle. It was developed by the King Abdullah Design and Development Bureau (now Jordan Design and Development Bureau) and SHP Motorsports to meet an operational requirement identified by the Jordanian Armed Forces (JAF) for a cost-effective, light-weight, rapid deployment vehicle which would be used to secure its territorial borders. The Desert Iris can mount a range of weaponry on its multi-purpose weapons tray. This unit can be fitted and removed easily and rapidly, enabling the Desert Iris to be re-configured as required by ground forces.

== Variants ==
- Desert Iris TOW : The Iris is configured with a mounted anti-tank TOW along the back side of the vehicle.
- Desert Iris MRLS: Enables most handheld rocket launcher systems to be mounted to the back side of the vehicle.
- Desert Iris 12.7 mm: A 12.7 mm machine gun is fitted to weapons tray the back side of the vehicle.
- Desert Iris UAV: The weapons tray comes with a UAV launcher platform mounted to the back side of the vehicle.

== Armament ==
The vehicle includes a weapon frame and ring mount directly behind the driver/commander seats that permits the vehicle to carry a variety of weapons based on the mission profile. Some include a basic 12.7 mm machine gun up to and including a TOW launcher.

== Propulsion ==
The Desert Iris was built around Toyota automotive components and a 2.8 liter four-cylinder Toyota engine. It is able to be utilized as a fast attack platform due to its capable operational range of 600 km on paved surfaces and 400 km off-road. The engine develops 100 Bhp/ 75 KW at 4200 rpm. The independent double wishbone with coil-over-shock suspension in the front and independent training arms in the rear give the Desert Iris tremendous stability and off-road mobility. The vehicle is able to maneuver over slopes of 60% incline vertical, as well as 40% horizontal.
