= USS Iris =

Five ships in the United States Navy have been named USS Iris for Iris, who in Greek mythology is the goddess of the rainbow

- USS Iris (1847), was commissioned in 1847, served during the Mexican–American War and was decommissioned in 1848
- USS Iris (1863), was built in 1863, served in the American Civil War, and decommissioned in 1865
- USS Iris (1869), was a monitor built as USS Shiloh in 1865, renamed Iris in 1869 and decommissioned in 1874
- USS Iris (1885), was commissioned in 1898 and decommissioned in 1916
- USS Iris (1897), was a lighthouse tender, built in 1897, transferred to the US Navy in 1917 and returned to the Department of Commerce in 1919
