= Beijing International Art Biennale =

The Beijing International Art Biennale (BIAB) is a Chinese bienniale for international contemporary art, hosted in Beijing. It has taken place since 2003, with a schedule that was pushed back one year in 2008 to coincide with the Beijing Olympics. It is organized by the Chinese Artists Association and characterized by diverse international participation.

== Past events ==
=== 1st Biennale - 2003 ===
Held from 20 September to 20 October, the first Biennale featured 577 works from 45 countries.

=== 2nd Biennale - 2005 ===
This was held from September 20 to October 20, at the China Millennium Monument, Beijing World Art Museum, and National Art Museum of China. It featured 600 works from 50 countries.

=== 3rd Biennale - 2008 ===
The third Biennale was held from July 8 to August 24, 2008, under the title "Colors and Olympism". The biannual schedule was offset by one year to coincide with the Beijing Olympic Games, and borrowed from its theme. Exhibitions were held at the National Art Museum of China (July 8 to August 12) and in the Exhibition Hall of the Central Academy of Fine Arts (July 7 to August 24). It featured 747 works by artists from 81 countries, including mainly sculptures and paintings. According to the curator Wang Yong, this showed both recent trends in Chinese art, and the reawakened global interest in painting.

Internationally, this Biennale was not widely noted; in Art in America it was criticized as a "lackluster overview exhibition" that featured "hastily commissioned paintings of heroic Chinese soldiers", while contemporary, avant-garde art from China was only seen in exhibitions of private galleries. ^{[3]} In response to this criticism, "innovation does not necessarily mean new media and new formats".

A prize was awarded for an Olympic Sport image, Die Springer, by Sandra Ackermann.

=== 4th Bienniale - 2010 ===
Held from September 20 to October 4, 2010 under the theme "Environmental Concern and Human Existence". It featured 535 artists and 562 works from 94 countries.

=== 5th Bienniale - 2012 ===
Held from September 28 to October 22, 2012 under the theme "The Future and Reality". It featured over 700 exhibited works from 84 countries.
