= French ship Iris =

A number of vessels of the French Navy have borne the name Iris.

Note: Between 1781 and 1784, the French Navy had two frigates named Iris:

- Iris, a 32-gun frigate captured from the British in 1781, who had themselves captured her from American rebels. She was sold in 1784.
- Iris was launched at Toulon in 1781. The British captured her at Toulon on 28 August 1793, and burned her on their evacuation of the city in December.

Other French ships named Iris:

- Iris (1806), a 20-gun corvette.
- Iris (1934), a Minerve-class submarine
