= List of equipment of the Royal Moroccan Army =

Modern equipment of the Royal Moroccan Armed Forces.

This is a list of equipment currently in service with the Royal Moroccan Army. Sources are the United States Excess Defense Articles (EDA) database, UNROCA, INSS Israel's Middle East Military Balance, World Small Arms Inventory, SIPRI Trade registers and the Military Balance in the Middle East by CSIS, and Army-Guide.

== Infantry equipment ==
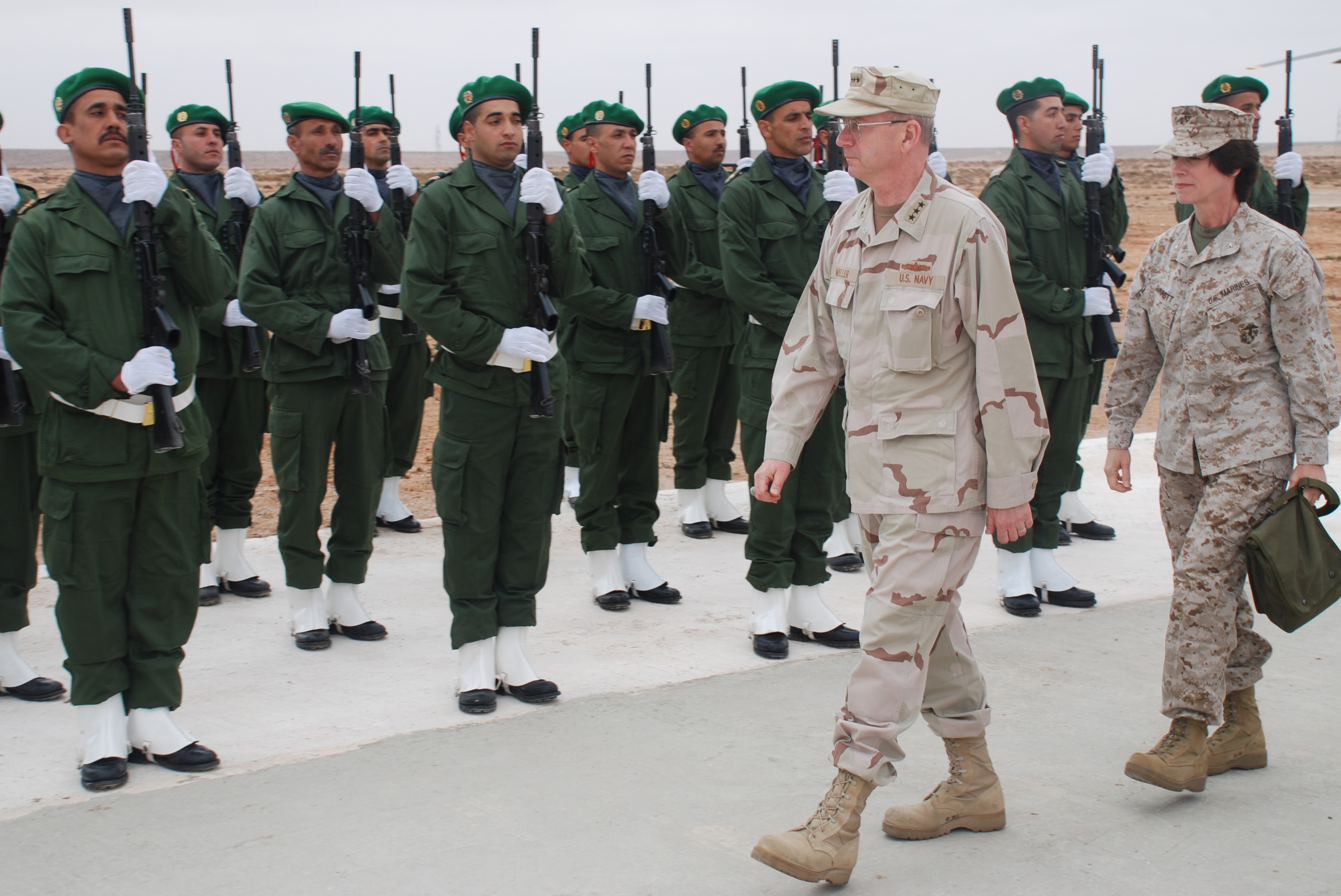
Royal Moroccan Army honor platoon

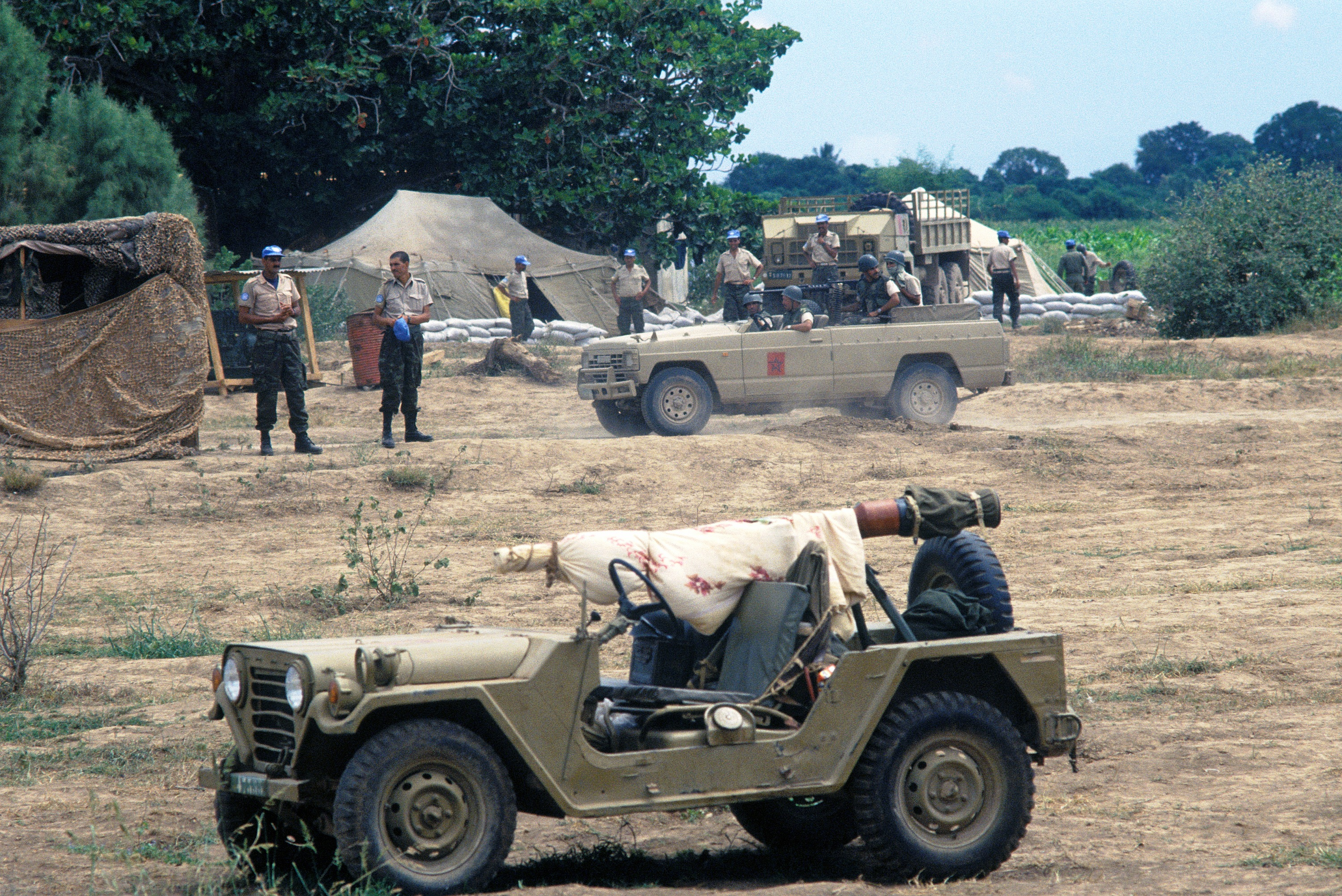
Moroccan jeeps, armed with anti-tank weapons (UNOSOM II)

Moroccan Soldiers with Olive Drab Battle Uniform and SPECTRA helmet.

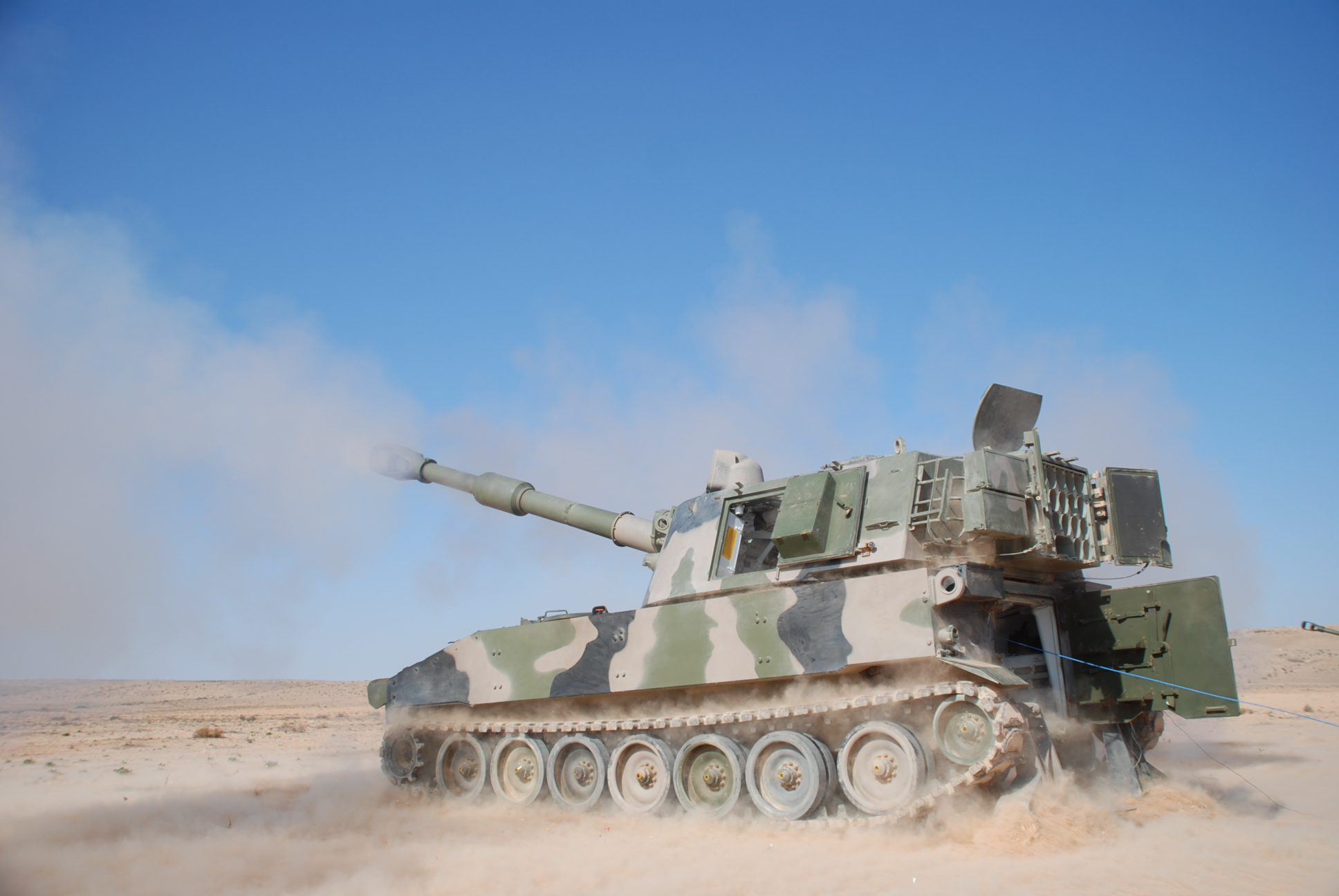
M109A5 Howitzer from the Moroccan 15th Royal Artillery Group

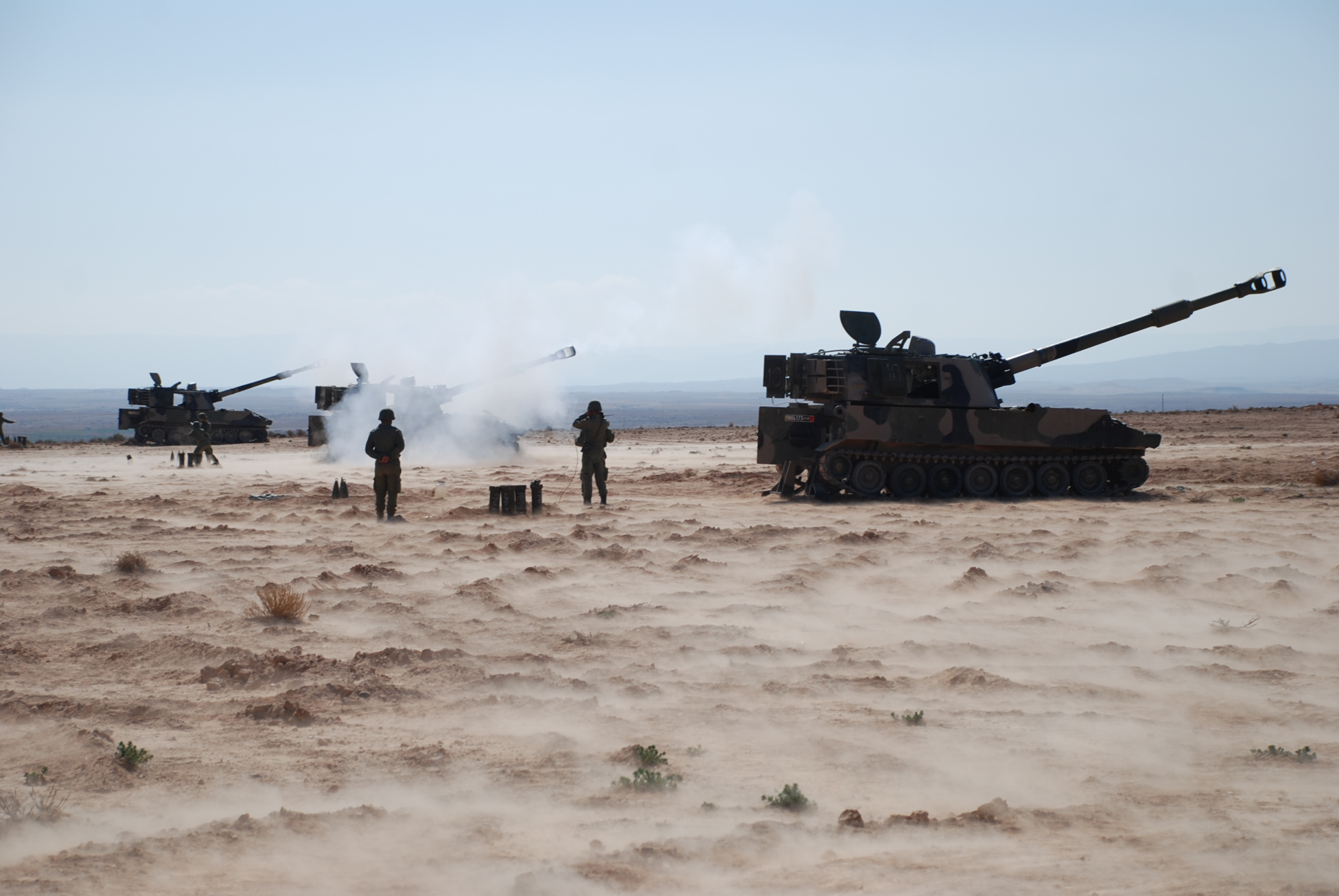
M109A5 Howitzer Crews from the Moroccan 15th Royal Artillery Group.

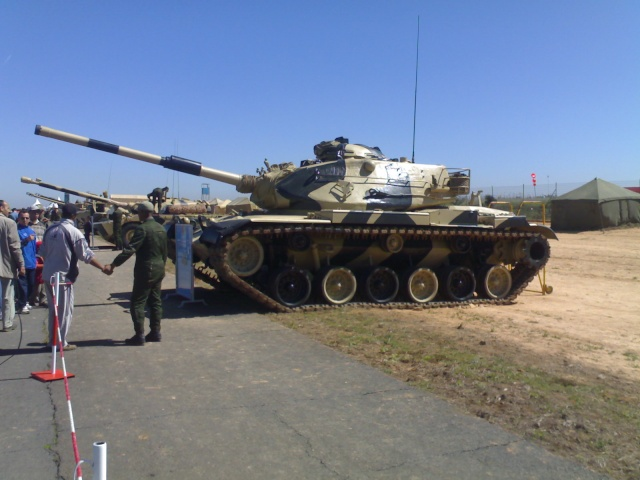
Moroccan M60A1 during a 2006 Army expo

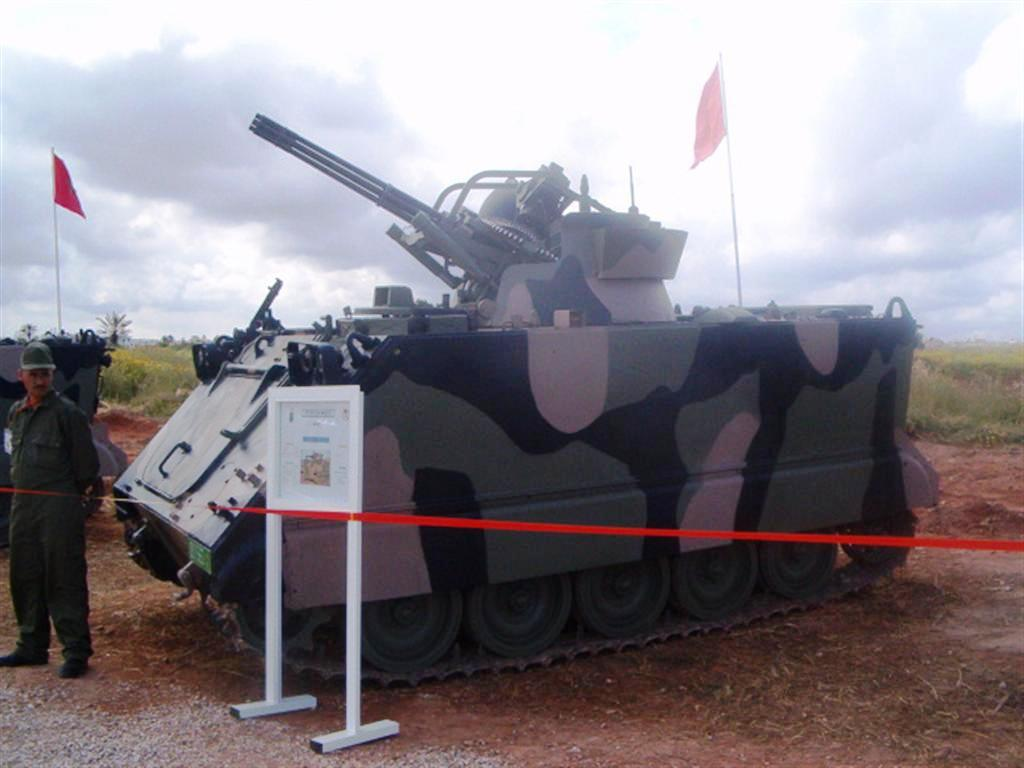
M163 VADS of the Royal Moroccan Army during a 2006 Army Exp

Individual equipment
Name	Image	Origin	Type	Notes
SPECTRA helmet		France	Combat helmet	Used by ground forces, large quantities, manufactured locally by MSA Mohammedia
Kavro MKH/ACH-7		India	Combat helmet	Standard issue helmet as of February 2024 (MKU Kavro MKH/ACH-7 version).
Modular Integrated Communications Helmet		United States	Combat helmet	Used by special forces and naval infantry.
Gallet TC 801		France	Combat helmet	Used by special forces, produced locally by MSA Mohammedia
Future Assault Shell Technology helmet		United States	Combat helmet	Used by special forces.
M1 helmet		United States	Combat helmet	For training purpose, no longer in service.
OG-107		United States	Combat uniform	Former army combat uniform, replaced by a new one, used for training
Woodland-type Camouflage		Morocco	Combat uniform	Current standard issue camouflage of the ground forces, domestically designed but no official name.
Camouflage Central-Europe		France	Combat uniform	Still in use.
Desert Lizard		France	Combat uniform	Still in use by some units .
Red Lizard		France	Combat uniform	Still in use by paratrooper units.
Operational Camouflage Pattern		United States	Combat uniform	Used by the 1st Atlas Combat Brigade and Air Special Forces Company
Personnel Armor System for Ground Troops		United States	Combat helmetBulletproof vest	Phased out.
Kavro TAC-I-II B+		India	Bulletproof vest	Standard issue bulletproof vest as of February 2024 . (Kavro TAC-I-II B+ version) .
Combat Integrated Releasable Armor System		United States	Bulletproof vest	Used by Saharan units.
Soldier Plate Carrier System		United States	Plate carrier	Used by SF.
AN/PVS-14		United States	Night-vision device	Used by ground forces and special forces.
AN/PVS-31		United States	Night-vision device	Ordered in Mai 2026
AN/PVS-7		United States	Night-vision device	Used by special forces
AN/PVS-4		United States	Passive Night-vision device	Formerly used by infantry, out of service.
1PN93-1		Russia	Passive Night-vision device	Appeared in use by the 1er BIP on the AK-105.
Pulsar Edge		United States	Night-vision device	Used by special forces and ground forces
AMBIA			Night-vision device	Used by special forces
Leupold HAMR		United States	Telescopic sight	Mounted on the M4A1, used by special forces
Trijicon MRO® HD		United States	Red dot sight	Coupled with a 3x flip magnifier, used by special forces.
Aimpoint CompM4		United States	Red dot sight	Mounted on the M4A1, used by paratroopers
Advanced Combat Optical Gunsight		United States	prismatic telescopic sights	Mounted on M4 and M16A4, used by special forces
EOTech		United States	Holographic weapon sight	Mounted on various small arms, used by special forces.
CornerShot		Israel	Weapon accessory	Seen in use by the GIGR.
AN/PEQ-2		United States	Laser sight (firearms)	Used by the special forces.
AN/PEQ-15		United States	Laser sight (firearms)	Used by special forces.
AN/PEQ-16		United States	Laser sight (firearms)	Used by Special Forces.

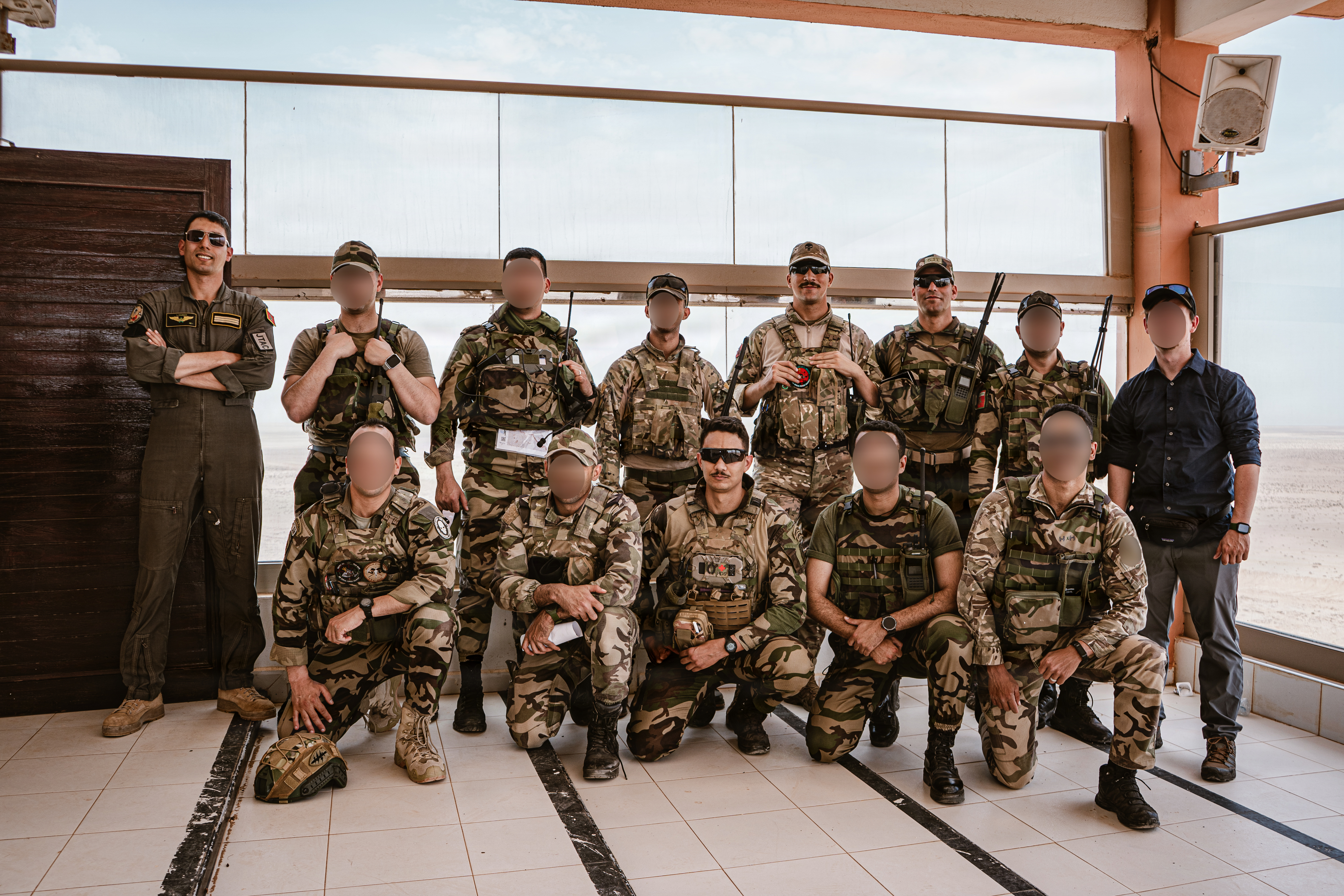
Moroccan RMAF, GFS, infantry and ASFC JTAC/TACP operators

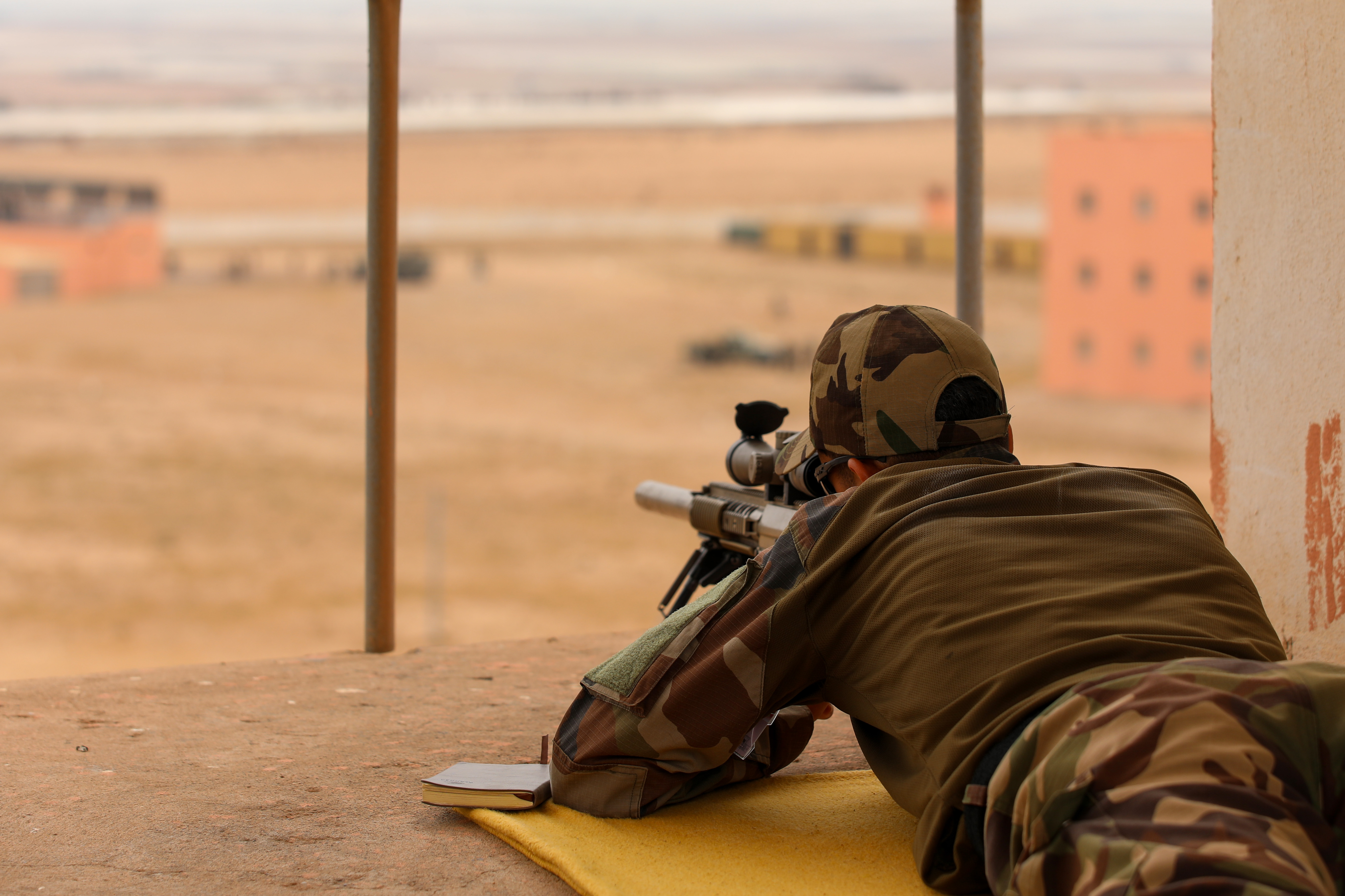
A Royal Moroccan Armed Forces Special Operations sniper provides overwatch

=== Weapons ===
Name	Image	Caliber	Type	Origin	Notes
Pistols
Beretta 92		9×19mm Parabellum	Semi-automatic pistol	Italy	Used by the police and several army/special forces units.
Beretta APX		9×19mm Parabellum	Semi-automatic pistol	Italy	New pistol for BRI/BCI squads
Beretta M9		9×19mm Parabellum	Semi-automatic pistol	Italy	New pistol for BRI/BCI squads
Browning Hi-Power		9×19mm Parabellum	Semi-automatic pistol	Belgium	Used by paratroopers
MAC Mle 1950		9×19mm Parabellum	Semi-automatic pistol	France	Used by royal gendarmerie
MAB PA-15		9×19mm Parabellum	Semi-automatic pistol	France	Standard service pistol
TT 33		7.62×25mm	Semi-automatic pistol	Soviet Union	Still in use.
Glock 19		9x19 Parabellum	Semi-automatic pistol	Austria	Used by special forces and BCIJ counter-terrorism forces and GIMR
Glock 17		9x19 Parabellum	Semi-automatic pistol	Austria	Used by special forces.
Beretta Px4 Storm		9×19mm Parabellum.40 S&W.45 ACP	Semi-automatic pistol	Italy	In use with the BCI and BRI police squads
Submachine guns
IWI Tavor X95		9×19mm Parabellum	Submachine gun	Israel	X95 SMG variant, seen in a police parade
Heckler & Koch MP5		9×19mm Parabellum	Submachine gun	West Germany	Used by tank crews. Also issued for special forces (GSIGR, BCIJ), customisable, all versions in use include A3 and Kurz variants.
Brügger & Thomet MP9		9×19mm Parabellum	Submachine gun	Switzerland	Used by the GIMR (Groupe D'intervention de la Marine Royale)
Beretta PMX		9×19mm Parabellum	Submachine gun	Italy	Seen in use by BRI
Shotguns
Mossberg 500		12 gauge	Shotgun	United States	Used by the army
Benelli M4		12 gauge	Shotgun	United States	Used by counter-terrorism forces and anti-narcotics
Franchi SPAS-12		12 gauge	Shotgun	Italy	Used by the royal gendarmerie
Rifles
AK-103		7.62×39mm	Assault rifle	Russia	Used by paratroopers (2eme BIP), the Mountain brigade
AK-105		5.45×39mm	Assault rifle	Russia	Used by the 1st BIP
Beretta AR70/90		5.56×45mm NATO	Assault rifle	Italy	Used by special forces
VCD 15		5.56×45mm NATO.300 AAC Blackout	Assault rifle	France	Used by special forces
FN SCAR		5.56×45mm NATO	Assault rifle	Belgium	Used by paratroopers and SF
Heckler & Koch HK416		5.56×45mm NATO	Assault rifle	Germany	Seen in use by the COS brigade in Qatar
Tavor TAR-21		5.56×45mm NATO	Assault rifle	Israel	Seen in use by BRI
Beretta ARX160		5.56×45mm NATO	Assault rifle	Italy	Seen in use by BRI
M16A4		5.56×45mm NATO	Assault rifle	United States	Used by marine commandos and BCI units.
M4 carbine		5.56×45mm NATO	Assault rifle	United States	Used by the paratroopers and special forces (MSOF and GOS team)
Steyr AUG		5.56×45mm NATO	Assault rifle	Austria	Used by the BCI and the BRI squads, all versions in use
SAR 21		5.56×45mm NATO	Assault rifle	Singapore	Used by gendarmerie units, royal guard and paratroopers.
FN F2000		5.56×45mm NATO	Assault rifle	Belgium	Heavily used in the Royal Gendarmerie, all variants are customisable
Misr assault rifle		7.62×39mm	Assault rifle	Egypt	Standard infantry assault rifle of Royal Moroccan Army (mainly the M16A2 as of early 2024).
M16A1 M16A2 M16A3		5.56×45mm NATO	Assault rifle	United States	Standard infantry assault rifle of Royal Moroccan Army (mainly the M16A2 as of early 2024).
Pistol Mitralieră model 1963/1965		7.62×39mm	Assault rifle	Romania	Standard infantry assault rifle of Royal Moroccan Army (mainly the M16A2 as of early 2024).
Type 56		7.62×39mm	Assault rifle	China	Standard infantry assault rifle of Royal Moroccan Army (mainly the M16A2 as of early 2024).
Heckler & Koch G3		7.62×51mm NATO	Battle rifle	Germany	Used as a battle rifle (G3A3/A4/H&K11) and a designated marksman's rifle (PSG1)
FN FAL		7.62×51mm NATO	Battle rifle	Belgium	In use with the army and Royal guard. FAL (50-00) variant.
Machine guns
M249		5.56×45mm NATO	light machine gun	United States	
Ultimax 100		5.56×45mm NATO	General-purpose machine gun	Singapore	
FN MAG		7.62×51mm NATO	General-purpose machine gun	Belgium	MAG-60-20 Infanterie T1, Standard machine gun
M240 machine gun		7.62×51mm NATO	General-purpose machine gun	United States	Used by SF, all variants
PK machine gun		7.62×54mmR	General-purpose machine gun	Soviet Union	
RPK		7.62×39mm	Light machine gun	Soviet Union	No longer in service
M60 machine gun		7.62×51mm NATO	General-purpose machine gun	United States	
M134 Minigun		7.62×51mm NATO	Rotary Medium machine gun	United States	Used on helicopters
M2 Browning		.50 BMG	Heavy machine gun	United States	Used on vehicles and tanks
DShK		12.7×108mm	Heavy machine gun	Soviet Union	No longer in service
NSV machine gun		12.7×108mm	Heavy machine gun	Soviet Union	Used on T-72 tanks, still in service
KPV heavy machine gun		14.5 × 114 mm	Heavy machine gun	Czech Republic	Standard heavy machine gun since 2023, supplied by Czech firm Excalibur Army.
M621 cannon		20 mm caliber	Autocannon	France	Used on the Aérospatiale SA 330 Puma and the Aérospatiale Gazelle, close air support roles
20 mm modèle F2 gun		20 mm caliber	Autocannon	France	Mounted on the Véhicule de l'Avant Blindé, VAB VCI 6x6 Toucan I version, used for counter-sniping and fire-support roles
Sniper rifles
M14NM		7.62×51mm NATO	Sniper rifle	United States	
Remington Model 700		.338 Lapua Magnum	Bolt action	United States	Used by the DGST SF, Model 700 and Magpul Pro 700 versions in use.
PGM Ultima Ratio		7.62×51mm NATO	Sniper rifle	France	Standard-issue army sniper rifle
PGM 338		.338 Lapua Magnum	Sniper rifle	France	Used by the Royal Gendarmerie.
HK PSG1		7.62×51mm NATO	Sniper rifle	West Germany	Used by paratroopers.
M110		7.62×51mm NATO	semi-automatic precision rifle	United States	Used by SF
Mauser SP66		7.62×51mm NATO	Sniper rifle	Germany	Used by police units
Tikka T3		.308 Winchester	Sniper rifle	Finland	Used by GSIGR snipers, Tikka T3x Tac A1 variant
Beretta ARX200		7.62×51mm NATO	Designated marksman rifle	Italy	New DMR for the BCI/BRI units
SR-25		7.62×51mm NATO	Designated marksman rifle semi-automatic Sniper rifle	United States	Appeared in African Lion 2024, used by special forces, SR-25 E2 variant.
Mk 13 Mod 5		.300 Winchester Magnum	Sniper rifle	United States	Appeared in African Lion 2024, used by special forces.
Barrett M82		.50 BMG	Semi-automatic rifleAnti-materiel rifle	United States	Used by SF
FR F2 sniper rifle		7.62×51mm NATO	Sniper rifle	France	Used by police units.
LA115A3		.338 Lapua Magnum	Sniper rifle	United Kingdom	Used by the SF, in small numbers
M24 Sniper Weapon System		7.62×51mm NATO	Bolt action Sniper rifle	United States	Used by the BCIJ and the GIGR
Grenade launchers
GL1		40 mm	grenade launcher	Belgium	Used by GR on the FN F2000 rifle .
M203 grenade launcher		40 mm	grenade launcher	United States	M203, M203A1and M203A2 all in service in the army and special forces. large stock
GLX-160		40 mm	grenade launcher	Italy	GLX160 standalone and mounted under the Beretta NARP/ARX160A3 for BCI/BRI
Mk 19		40 mm	Automatic grenade launcher	United States	Large quantities
Milkor MGL		40 mm	Grenade launcher	United States	Used by law enforcement and ground forces
STK 40 AGL		40 mm	Automatic grenade launcher	Singapore	Large quantities

=== Anti-tank weapons ===
The Royal Moroccan Army employs a variety of anti-tank weapons, ranging from disposable, man-portable rockets to armored tank destroyers equipped with guided missiles.

Portable anti-tank rockets are employed by the infantry. Recoilless rifles are still in use, often mounted on trucks or other military vehicles, but they are being replaced by more effective anti-tank guided missiles. Tank destroyers represent the most mobile and best protected anti-tank weapons in service. Older gun-armed vehicles are being replaced by missile-equipped vehicles. Several of the army's infantry fighting vehicles are likewise equipped with anti-tank missiles, adding to the anti-tank weaponry available in the field.

Anti-tank weapons of the Royal Moroccan Army
System	Type	Origin	Image	Qty	Notes
M40A1	Recoilless rifle	United States		350	
SPG-9	Recoilless rifle	Bulgaria		496	ATGL-H Bulgarian version
B-10	Recoilless rifle	Soviet Union			Obsolete
RK-3 Corsar	Anti-tank guided missile	Ukraine		U/N	
BGM-71 TOW	Anti-tank guided missile	United States		(1,200) TOW 2A, Radio Frequency (RF) Missiles (BGM-71-4B-RF) (2,401) TOW 2A, Radio Frequency (RF) Missiles (BGM-71-4B-RF); and twenty eight (28) TOW 2A, Radio Frequency (RF) Missiles (BGM-71-4B-RF), Fly-to-Buy missiles for lot acceptance testing; and Four hundred (400) M220A2 TOW Launchers and four hundred (400) M41 Improved Target Acquisition System (ITAS) Launchers.	
Spike MR	Anti-tank guided missile	Israel		U/N	
Spike SR	Anti-tank guided missile	Israel		U/N	
Spike LR2	Anti-tank guided missile	Israel		Morocco acquired the LR2 ATGM	
Spike NLOS	Anti-tank guided missile	Israel		Morocco acquired the NLOS ATGM	
Skif (anti-tank guided missile)	Anti-tank guided missile	Ukraine		125 launchers,1000 missiles	
FGM-148 Javelin	Anti-tank guided missile	United States		200 LWCLU launchers,612 missiles	
AGM-179 JAGM	Anti-tank guided missile	United States		During MAS26 , RMAF AH-64E Apaches were confirmed to be using the AGM-179 JAGM	
AGM-114 Hellfire	Anti-tank guided missile	United States		AGM-114L/R variants, used on the AH-64E attack helicopter	
9M133 Kornet	Anti-tank guided missile	Russia		At least 2300 missiles	Kornet-E version seen in 2019 , large quantities
9M113 Konkurs	Anti-tank guided missile	Soviet Union			Konkurs-M version, acquired via India. Large quantities
9K115-2 Metis-M	Anti-tank guided missile	Russia			Large quantities
MILAN	Anti-tank guided missile	France; West Germany		~850	
HJ-8L	Anti-tank guided missile	People's Republic of China		U/N	
HOT (missile)	Anti-tank guided missile	France		U/N	HOT-1 and HOT-2 versions, mounted on Aérospatiale Gazelle
HJ-9	Anti-tank guided missile	People's Republic of China		U/N	, seen in manoeuvres in the northern sector
M47 Dragon	Anti-tank guided missile	United States		440 Launchers	Large stock of missiles
9M14 Malyutka	Anti-tank guided missile	Soviet Union		50	
Cobra (missile)	Anti-tank guided missile	West Germany		~250	Used on the UR-416 APC
LRAC-F1	Shoulder-launched missile weapon	France		2000+	
APILAS	Shoulder-launched missile weapon	France		1000+	
Type 69	Anti-tank rocket	People's Republic of China			Bipod launcher
RPG-7V	Anti-tank rocket	Soviet Union			
AT4	Anti-tank rocket	United States		U/N	AT4CS version
M72 LAW	Anti-tank rocket	United States		500+	
M20 Super Bazooka	Anti-tank rocket	United States			Limited use; obsolescent
M901 ITV	Tank destroyer	United States		105	

== Vehicles ==
=== Utility vehicles ===
The RMA's high-mobility multipurpose vehicles serves as cargo/troop carrier, weapons platform, and ambulance, among many other roles. 4000 HMMWV in different versions, 1,200 URO VAMTACs and 800 URO VAM-TL are part of RMAs inventory, which also includes various CUCVs. 378 GM Defense CUCVs (138 M1008, 188 M1009 and 52 M1028) and 278 M151s were received, and an unknown number of Santana Motor's Land Rover Model 88/106, Toyota FJ40, Jeep Auverland and Nissan Patrol ML-6 are also in service. An unknown number of ACMAT AVTL have also been purchased.

Military logistics' missions are the storage, distribution, maintenance, evacuation, and disposition of materiel, the transport of personnel, the acquisition or construction, maintenance, operation, and disposition of facilities, the acquisition or furnishing of services and Medical and health service support. It is the most important part and considered the base for the main mission of the RMA. Because of its topography and extensive range of action, the transport and resupply of troops posted in the Wall and East Frontier, where aerial transport is impossible or counterproductive, the use of land transport is primordial. The amount of active equipment is unknown, but estimations are possible. The number of medium and heavy trucks, HETs and Palletized Load Systems (PLS) purchased or in service were 250 IVECO M3-21.14 TT, ~3500 M35 and Variants, 387 M54 and variants, ~1,000 M800 series, 195 M816 Wrecker, ~160 M900 series, ~1000 TRM10000/9000 BMH, 600 ACMAT VLRA and 92 Tata LPTA 2445. An unknown number of Pegaso 3055, Mercedes-Benz Actros and Unimog are also in RMA's inventory. The Heavy Equipment Transport Systems (HETS) received were an unknown number of M746, 6 M747, 23 M1070, 133 M911 HETS and 100 IVECO TRACTOR. Two M1075 & M1076 Palletized load systems were also purchased.

Armoured recovery vehicles (ARV) are used to repair damaged as well as broken-down armoured vehicles during combat, or to tow them out of the danger zone for more extensive repairs. For this mission 86 M578, 10 SK-105 ARV, 4 VT1A ARV and 81 M88 Recovery Vehicles were acquired.

Military engineering vehicles are vehicles built for the construction work or for the transportation of combat engineers on the battlefield. Bulldozers are extensively used, all along with 6 M728 Combat Engineer Vehicle.

=== Tanks ===
Around 1100 tanks are in service: 54 VT-1A, 222 M1A1SA & 162 M1A2 SEPv3, 148 T-72B and 535 M60A1/A1 rise/A3/A3TTS. M48 Pattons were retired from active service and stored as reserve with the 1991 cease-fire, the SK-105 Kürassiers had the same fate. Some media outlets have claimed that Morocco transferred T‑72 tanks to Ukraine during the Russian invasion; however, this has been denied by Moroccan sources, and reports confirm that the tanks were sent to the Czech Republic only for modernization.

Model	Image	Origin	Quantity	Notes
M1 Abrams		United States	384	-222 M1A1SA -162 M1A2 SEPv3 on order
M60		United States	535	still in use, locally upgraded -108 M60A1s transferred from US in 1981. 300 former US Marine Corps M60A1s acquired from 1991 to 1994, 120 M60A3 TTS and 7 M60A1 in 1997. Army’s M60A1 tanks purchased in the '90s were all upgraded to M60A3s as these became available, and 140 upgraded to M60A3TTS in 2009, 260 M60A3TTS and 167 M60A3 in service as of 2023 Upgraded in 2026 with advanced optronics , new 120mm cannon , new engine and modernized armor
M48 Patton		United States	225	Locally upgraded Stored
VT-1A Al Khalid		China; Pakistan	54	150 were ordered around 2010. 54 received in 2011, the rest was cancelled due to engine replacement issues
T-72B/BK		Soviet Union Belarus; Czech Republic	148	40 T-72B and 47 T-72EA. 47 T-72B tanks were procured and upgraded from the Czech Excalibur company, all existing units were upgraded with the company in Morocco adding CITV, and other advanced equipments (6th royal armored brigade:The Russian brigade)
SK-105 Kürassier		Austria	111	Light tank; They are held in reserve, locally modernized and used in the Moroccan portions of the Sahara.
AMX-10 RC		France	105	Tank destroyer

=== Armoured personnel carriers, infantry fighting vehicles and support vehicles ===
Model	Image	Origin	Type	Quantity	Notes
Armoured personnel carriers/Infantry fighting vehicles
M113		United States	Armoured personnel carrier	~1172	400 M113A1, M113A2, 419 M113A3, 86 M577A2 (CP), 80 M901, 60 M163, 36 M106A2, 91 M1064A3 Upgraded with modern RCWS platforms
AIFV		United States	Armoured personnel carrier	123	19 AIFV-B-.50 + 90 AIFV-B-C25 + 1 AIFV-B-CP
AMX-10P		France	Armoured personnel carrier	10	
M1117 armored security vehicle		United States	Armored security vehicle	597	will replace older armored 4x4 vehicles in service
Eland armoured car		Union of South Africa	Reconnaissance	16	Eland 20/90
BRDM-2		Soviet Union	Reconnaissance	U/N	
AML 60/90		France	Armored car (military)	228	190 AML-90 and 38 AML-60
Ratel IFV		Union of South Africa	Armored car (military)	60	30 Ratel 20 + 30 Ratel 90
EE-9 Cascavel		Brazil	Armored car (military)	7	
Panhard ERC		France	Armored car (military)	40	
TATA Kestrel		India	Armoured personnel carrier	5	150 on order. To be locally produced by Tata Advanced Systems
OT-64 SKOT		Czechoslovakia / Polish People's Republic	Armoured personnel carrier	95	
VAB VCI/VTT		France	Armoured personnel carrier	405	45 VAB VCI+ 320 VAB VTT+ 20 more of VAB-ECH. They had been modernised and upgraded locally under the name "ifrane".
Thyssen Henschel UR-416		West Germany	Armoured personnel carrier	70	
Cougar (MRAP)		United States	Mine-resistant ambush-protected	U/N	as seen in the photo, Cougar 6x6 is in service, seen in a Chinese-Moroccan film
Oshkosh M-ATV		United States	Mine-resistant ambush-protected	150+	Received through the SDAF program in 2025 from Casablanca's port, M-ATV Standard Base (SXB) variant
Ejder Yalçın		Turkey	Mine-resistant ambush-protected	34	(30 procured from Turkey with the SERDAR RCWS, 4 were given from the UAE as a gift)
Otokar Cobra II		Turkey	Mine-resistant ambush-protected	220	Morocco purchased the Cobra II MRAP vehicles. (200 for the ground forces + 20 for peacekeepers)
HMMWV		United States	Tactical vehicle	4000	all versions
URO VAMTACs		Spain	Tactical vehicle	+1200	locally assembled under the name Atlas
Sherpa Light		France	Tactical vehicle	36	APC version ordered for CAESAR crews and special forces
Lenco BearCat		United States	Tactical vehicle	88	used by the auxiliary forces and peacekeeping forces
Polaris RZR		United States	Tactical vehicle	U/N	used by M-SOF.

== Drones ==
Lately after the relations between Morocco and Israel were strengthened, many weapons were procured, including drones and loitering munitions

Name	Type	Picture	Numbers	Origin	Notes
IAI Harop	Loitering munition		Large quantities, locally manufactured	Israel	
IAI Harpy	Loitering munition		Large quantities, locally manufactured	Israel	
SkyStriker	Loitering munition		Large quantities, seen with the PULS MLRS, to be manufactured locally .	Israel	
SpyX	Loitering munition		Seen in use by the Moroccan ground forces, manufactured locally.	Israel	
Hero drone	Loitering munition		Reported to have been exported to Morocco	Israel	
Wander-B VTOL	Intelligence, surveillance, target acquisition, and reconnaissance		Seen in use by Morocco, 150 in service	Israel	
Thunder-B VTOL	Intelligence, surveillance, target acquisition, and reconnaissance		Seen in use by Morocco, 150 in service	Israel	
Thunder-B	Intelligence, surveillance, target acquisition, and reconnaissance		Exported to Morocco	Israel	

== Artillery ==
The Artillery, grouped in GARs, includes self-propelled howitzers, towed howitzers, multiple launch rocket systems and air defense systems, mortar carriers are part of the RIMZ.

The equipment includes: 300+ 155mm M109 SPH in different versions, 60 203mm M110A2 SPH, received as EDA from USA, and 100 155mm Mk F3 remain in service. Only 155mm towed howitzers are deployed all along the Moroccan Wall, that includes 140 155mm (M198, FH-70, M-1950, M114), 18 130mm (M1954). Besides this 54 105mm (M101 and L118) are deployed in different regions.

2 Battalions of multiple launch rocket are also listed as part of RMAs inventory, the first with 36 122mm BM-21 and the second with 36 300mm AR2.

Self-propelled artillery
Model	Country of origin	Type	Quantity	Notes	Image
Rocket artillery
BM-21	Soviet Union	Multiple rocket launcher	35	122mm, APR-21 Romanian version, still in service	
M142 HIMARS	United States	Multiple rocket launcher	18 (under delivery)	A 524 million USD deal for 18 systems, along with munitions and related systems	
PHL-03	China	Multiple rocket launcher	36	300mm, AR2 version with a range of 140 km, 1m CEP	
Lynx (multiple rocket launcher)	Israel	Multiple rocket launcher	12	300mm, PULS variant with a range of 300 km	
Ballistic missiles
LORA (missile)	Israel	Short-range ballistic missile	430km	Morocco and IAI are in very advanced stages of negotiations to export the LORA missile	
Predator Hawk	Israel	Rocket artillery	300 km	Predator Hawk was officially confirmed when it appeared with the moroccan PULS MLRS	
MGM-140 ATACMS	United States	Tactical ballistic missile	270 km	Morocco purchased 40 M57 ATACMS with a range of 300 km, along with the HIMARS system	
Cruise missiles
Delilah (missile)	Israel	Air-launched cruise missile	250 km	Used on the F-5E TII/III platforms	
Harpoon (missile)	United States	Air-launched cruise missile	124 km	Used on the F-16C/D	
AGM-154 Joint Standoff Weapon	United States	Glide bomb	130 km	Morocco purchased the JSOW-C variant, to be used on the F-16C/D	
Tracked Artillery
M109	United States	Self-propelled howitzer	>300	M109A1, A1B, A2, A3, A4, A5, A6	
2S19 Msta-S	Russia	Self-propelled howitzer	U/N	Rosoboronexport Deputy chief Viktor Komardin announced that Russia has delivered to Morocco a batch of Msta-S self-propelled howitzers	
Mk F3 155 mm	France	Self-propelled howitzer	100	. Locally modernized with new data links and new software and a new weapon system	
CAESAR	France	Self-propelled howitzer	36		
ATMOS 2000	Israel	Self-propelled howitzer	36		
M110	United States	Self-propelled howitzer	60		
Towed artillery
L118	United Kingdom	Field gun	30		
M101	United States	Field gun	20		
130 mm towed field gun M1954 (M-46)	Soviet Union	Field gun	18		
FH70	United Kingdom	Howitzer	30		
M114	United States	Howitzer	20		
M198 howitzer	United States	Howitzer	35		
M-50	France	Howitzer	35		
Self-propelled mortar
M125A1	United States	Mortar carrier	20	With an 81 mm M29 mortar	
M1064	United States	Mortar carrier	91	With a 120mm M120 mortar	
AML-60	France	Mortar carrier	35	With a Brandt Mle CM60A1	

== Air defense systems ==
After years of negligence of its air defense capabilities Morocco shifted its air defense strategy, investing heavily in new air defense bases and systems.

Morocco has been slowly building a multi-layered air defense system consisting of HIMAD and SHORAD systems in order to give Moroccan air space maximum protection.

Moroccan air defense system consists of the newly acquired advanced long range Chinese HIMAD systems the FD-2000B with a maximum range of 250 km range, the Chinese Sky Dragon 50 with a maximum range of 50 km, the Barak MX with multiple layers of coverage (35–150 km), and the American Patriot PAC-3 MSE with a range of 60 km against ballistic missiles

The man-portable air-defense systems used by the infantry are the 9K32 "Strela-2" (SA-7 Grail), 9K38 "Igla" (SA-18 Grouse).

Other systems include AAG as M1939 (61-K), ZU-23-2 or M167 VADS, usually mounted on LUVs and CUCVs.

This list shows only the publicly-known air defenses.

Model	Origin	Type		Notes	Image
Surface-to-air missiles
David's Sling	Israel	Missile defense	U/N	According to Europäische Sicherheit & Technik (ES&T), Morocco is in advanced negotiations to acquire the David's Sling missile defense system	
Barak MX	Israel	Air defense/Missile defense	6 batteries	, the version ordered is the Barak MX, with a range up to 250 km	
SPYDER	Israel	Air defense/Missile defense	U/N	Entered service	
Sky Dragon 50	China	Air defense/Missile defense	6 batteries	. 50 km range, IBIS 200 radar with a range of 200 km	
MICA	France	SHORAD	4 batteries	Each of the batteries will consist of four to six launcher units all received	
Aster (missile family)	France; Italy	SHORAD		Used in the FREMM multipurpose frigate, has a range of above 30 km, Aster 15 variant	
Aspide	Italy	SHORAD		Used in the Descubierta-class corvette, 25 km range, ordered between 1977 and 1983	
Crotale	France	SHORAD		(Crotale NG and Mk.3)	
Mistral (missile)	France	SHORAD		Mistral 3 version, will be used on the Sherpa Light APC	
KP-SAM Chiron	South Korea	SHORAD	50 launcher , 101 missiles		
MIM-72 Chaparral	United States	SHORAD	72 vehicles, 504 missiles	Unknown	
FIM-92 Stinger	United States	SHORAD	600 missiles	FIM-92K Block I	
9K32 Strela-2	Soviet Union	MANPADS		U/N	
9K38 Igla	Soviet Union	MANPADS		U/N	
Self-propelled anti-aircraft weapons
Tunguska M1	Soviet Union	Self-propelled anti-aircraft gun	12 vehicles in service.	2K22M1 version	
ZU-23-4	Soviet Union	Self-propelled anti-aircraft gun	100 (out of service)	ZU-23-4	
M163	United States	Self-propelled anti-aircraft gun	115		
Anti-aircraft guns
ZPU	Soviet Union	Anti-aircraft gun	~200	ZPU-2 ZPU-4	
ZU-23-2	Soviet Union	Anti-aircraft gun	~90		
M167 VADS	United States	Anti-aircraft gun	40		
Type 90	China	Anti-aircraft gun	>12 batteries		
Bofors 40 mm L/60 gun	Sweden	Anti-aircraft gun		Used on the Descubierta-class corvette	
Phalanx CIWS	United States	Close-in weapon system		Used on the USS Bristol County Sidi Mohammed Ben Abdellah 407	Phalanx CIWS is clearly installed on the top of the deck

== Radars ==
Model	Origin	Image	Type	Quantity	Notes
MSSR	United States		Air radar	U/N	
AN/TPS-63	United States		Air radar		the majority of the radars have been upgraded to the TPS-63 MSSR which has a range of 740 km
AN/TPS-70	United States		Air radar	U/N	
EL/M-2084	Israel		Air radar	U/N	part of the Barak MX system, has a max range of 475 km, Active electronically scanned array radar
YLC-2 Radar	China		Air radar	U/N	YLC-2V version with a range of 500 km, entered service in 2012
Ground Master 403	France		Air radar	3	
Ground Master 400	France		Air radar	2	
AN/TPS-77	United States		Air radar		463 km in range, depending on the state of deployment, AN/TPS-77 MRR version
AN/TPS-79	United States		Air radar		220 km range
AN/TPS-43	United States		Air radar		450 km range.
AN/MPQ-64 Sentinel	United States		Air radar	8	AN/MPQ-64F1 version
RASIT	France		Ground radar	U/N	
RATAC-S	Germany		Ground radar	U/N	Sold to Morocco
AF902 FC	Switzerland		Air radar	UN	Chinese copy of Skyguard
BOR-A 550	France		Ground radar	U/N	
AN/PPS-5A	United States		Ground radar	U/N	
AN/MPQ-49 Forward Area Alerting Radar	United States		Air radar	U/N	
Stentor battlefield radar	France		Ground radar	20	
ARSS-1	United States		Ground radar	12	
Bur radar	West Germany		Ground radar	U/N	

== Electronic Warfare ==
N.B : this list does not contain all EW systems used by Morocco

Model	Origin	Type	Notes	Quantity
Alinet system	Israel	Electronic warfare/Signals intelligence	70 million USD deal with Elbit Systems	U/N
KORAL-EW	Turkey	Electronic warfare	Morocco signed a deal with Turkish Aselsan to buy KORAL-EW.	U/N
Bukovel (counter unmanned aircraft system)	Ukraine	Electronic warfare	used as an anti-drone system, has a 70–100 km detection range and 15 km jamming range	
SkyLock Dome	Israel	Electronic warfare	also used as an anti-drone system	
AARTOS system	Germany	Electronic warfare	anti-drone system, used by the royal gendarmerie	
