= ACMAT =

French manufacturer of tactical vehicles

- Type: Société anonyme
- Industry: Manufacturing
- Founded: 1948; 78 years ago
- Headquarters: 1954 to 1964: Meaux, France; 1964 to present: Saint-Nazaire, France
- Key people: François Bouvier (CEO); Serge Perez (VP); Moun Bourjij (GM)
- Products: Trucks
- Owner: Volvo Trucks
- Number of employees: 150
- Website: Arquus Defense

ACMAT (Ateliers de Construction Mécanique de L'Atlantique, also known as ALM-ACMAT) (English: Atlantic Mechanical Construction Workshops) was a French company that has manufactured cross-country and tactical military vehicles since 1958. Known for their reliability, simplicity, ruggedness and their 80% (over 3,500) commonality of parts across the entire product line, their vehicles were originally targeted at African and Asian countries who could not afford more expensive vehicles. The company builds their vehicles based on standardisation, parts sharing, and backward compatibility, with some vehicles using the same parts as ones made 30 years ago. This system involves cabs, structural components, engines and drive trains, which are often shared between models.

ACMAT is a subsidiary of Arquus Defense, previously Renault Truck Defense, which since 22 May 2006 has been a wholly owned subsidiary of Renault Trucks.

Many French fire brigades also use ACMAT vehicles due to their lower cost and 4WD ability. Several thousand are in use by 42 countries including France and the Irish Defence Forces. ACMAT also designs, manufactures and builds trailers, shelters and generators. ACMAT has exported over 85 percent of the 12,000 plus vehicles it produced into 50 countries.

== History ==
ACMAT was founded as The ALM SA (Ateliers Legueu Meaux) in 1954 by René Legueu as a Meaux-based manufacturer of wheeled military vehicles. Some of their heavy trucks and commercial vehicles are also available in civilian versions. For commercial use, there are also vehicles for protection of persons and the use of public-sector units of authorities such as the police and the fire brigade. Since the start of production, the company has produced over 12,000 vehicles that are marketed in over 50 countries.[3] In 1964, the company moved its headquarters to Saint-Nazaire.

The company started as a developer and producer of vehicle parts, including transfer case and front axles for large-scale built trucks. The company holds patents for many of its in-house parts and technologies. This also gave rise to all-terrain trucks designed for agricultural uses. However, it remained only a concept and never made it to market but was then developed for the oil industry. A four-wheel and all-terrain version was included for the geophysical industry for use in the oil developments in the Sahara. With a range of just over 1,000 km on a single tank and operational capabilities in desert terrain, the vehicle offered increased viability in a hostile region, which appealed to the military.

From August 1961, production of the (now) ALM VCOM (Vehicle of de Combat d'Outre-Mer) began, with improvements to the vehicle under the direction of the Foreign Legion under testing in the Fennec Mission (Desert Fox). These tests were conducted during various missions in Mauritania and during the Chadian liberation war. A total of 193 units had been made by the completion of testing by the 13 Demi-brigade of the Foreign Legion in Djibouti.

To be closer to his father, Paul Legueu, the founder of the company moved the headquarters to Saint-Nazaire in 1964 and created a foundation, ACMAT SA (Ateliers de Constructions Mécaniques de l'Atlantique).

The company began the development of components including the front and rear axles, transmission and transfer case. This led to the company being awarded a further 12 patents. In 1967, the company launched its latest model, the ACMAT VLRA (Véhicule de Liaison de Reconnaissance et d'Appui > "Liaison, Reconnaissance, and Support Vehicle"). This was characterised by its robustness above all. It could transport 2.5 tonnes of payload, a maximum range of 1,600 km and a water tank with a capacity of 200L. The company produces an armoured variant of both the 4x4 and 6x6 versions of the VLRA.

In May 2006, ACMAT was acquired by Renault Trucks Defense SA, the majority shareholder of the company. ACMAT has been a subsidiary brand of the Volvo Group which Renault Trucks belongs to. [4] Under the guidance of the new board Moun Bourjij created in collaboration with Renault Trucks the ACMAT VLRA 2 (Véhicule de la Liaison de Reconnaissance et d'appui Blindé; "Armored Liaison, Reconnaissance, and Support Vehicle"), which launched in 2009. Based on the Nissan Navara, it is the seventh generation ACMAT AVTL (Aérotransportable Véhicule Tactique Léger; "Air Transportable Light Tactical Vehicle"). This model has been primarily been used in Afghanistan.

== Products ==
=== Current ===
- ACMAT VLRA (Liaison, Reconnaissance and Support Vehicle)
- ACMAT Bastion
- ACMAT AVTL (2008-2019)
- Ford Everest (ACMAT VT-4)
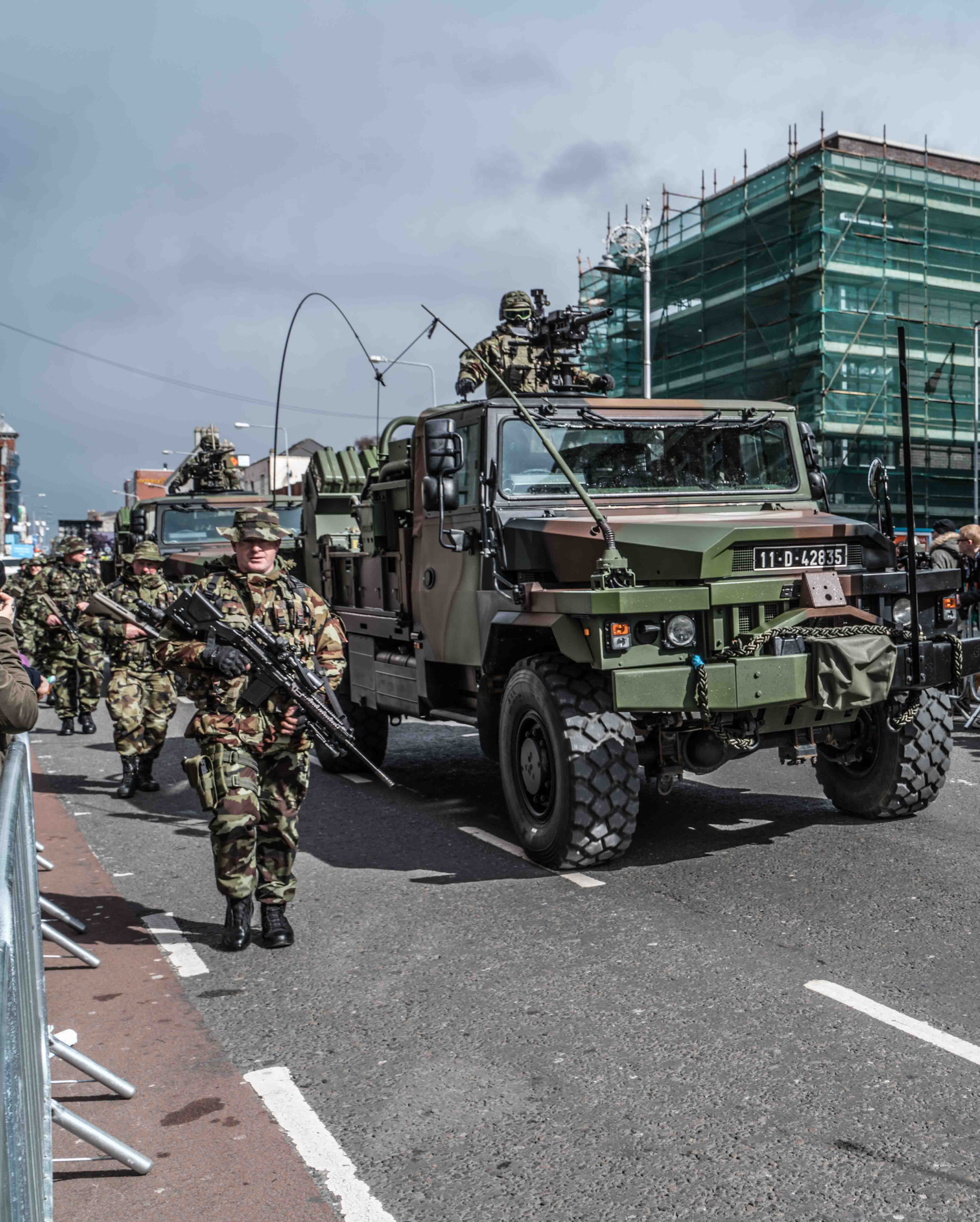
ACMAT VLRA used by the Irish ARW as a 'mothership' to resupply Ford F-350 SRVs

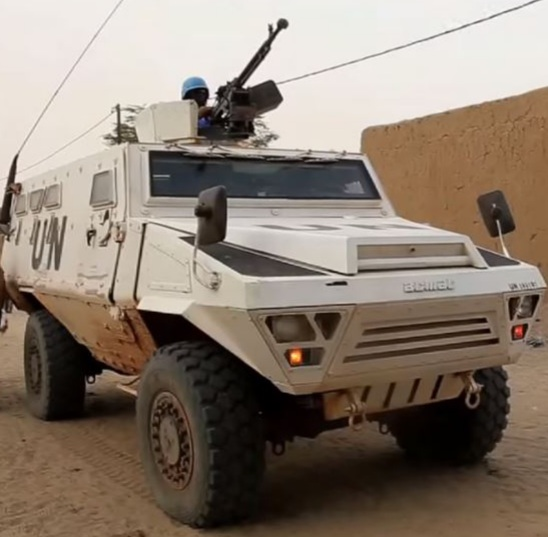
MINUSMA ACMAT Bastion

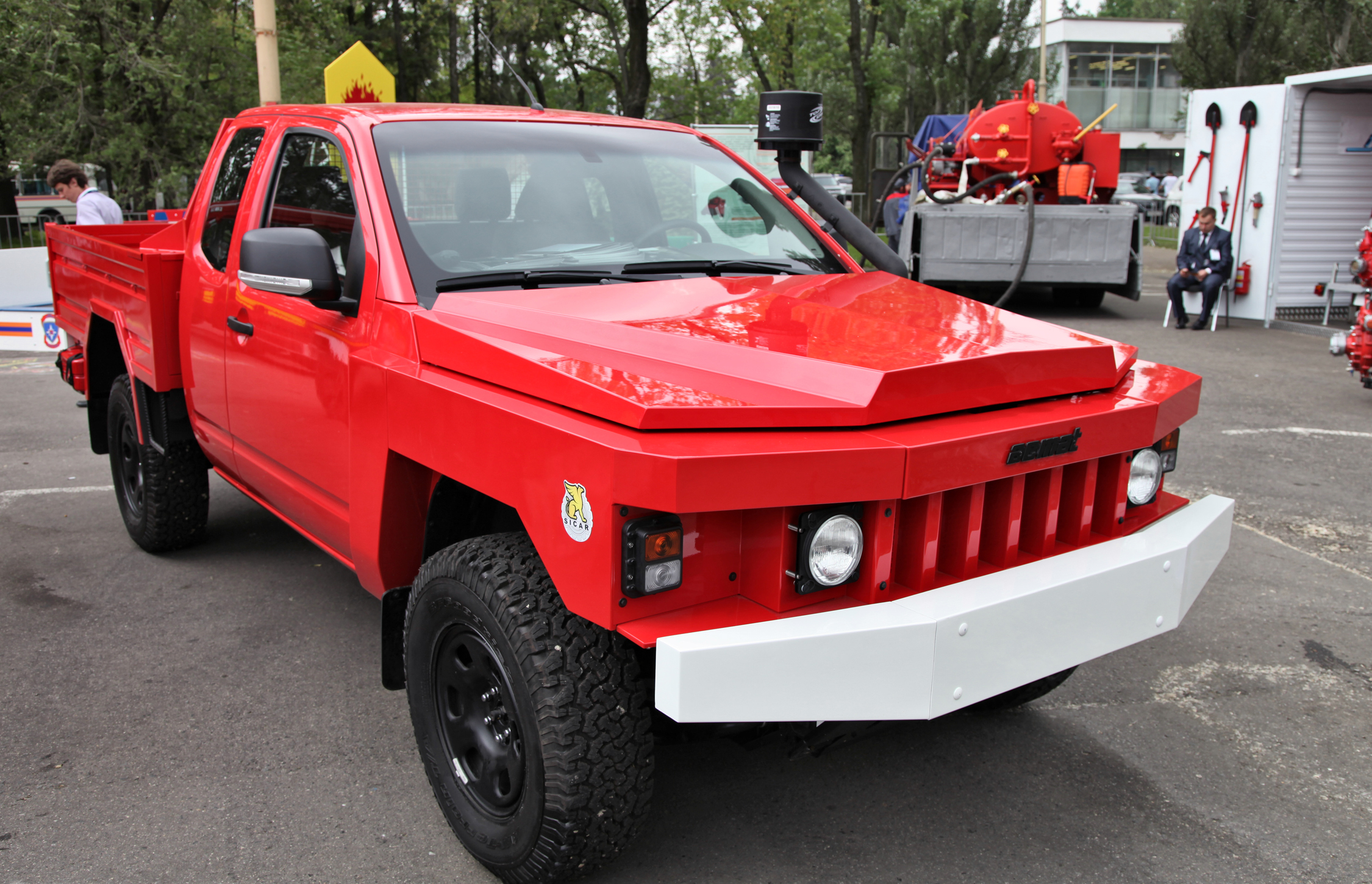
ACMAT AVTL

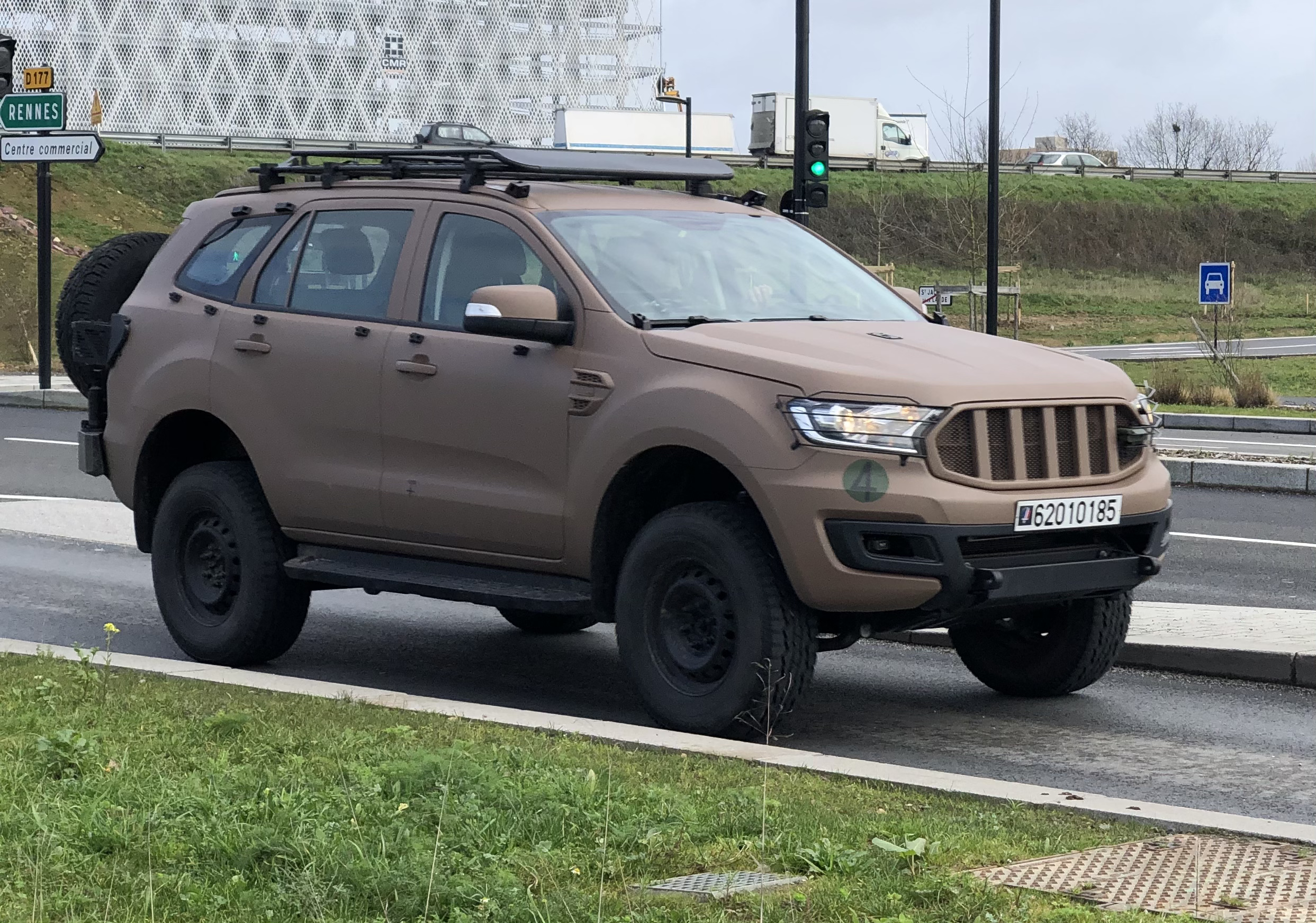
ACMAT VT-4

=== Past Vehicles ===
==== VLA ====
The ACMAT VLA (Véhicules logistiques de l'avant) is a cab-over design, available in 4x4, 6x6, 8x8, with a carrying capacity of 4,000 kg to 8,000 kg. It is primarily designed to carry pallets. Produced from 1991 to 2004 the VLA is no longer offered by ACMAT since 2006 when ACMAT became a subsidiary of Renault Trucks.

  - WPK 4.40 SH/STL 4x4 4ton, shelter/pallet
  - WPK 6.65 SH/STL 6x6 up to 15-foot (4.6 m) Container/pallet system "Hunter"
  - WPK 6.65 APL up to 20-foot (6.1 m) containers/pallets
  - WPK 8.75 SH 8x8 up to 20-foot (6.1 m) containers

==== VLRB ====
ACMAT VLRB (Véhicule de Liaison et de Reconnaissance Blindé) - The TCM 420 BL 6 is powered by a four-cylinder Cummins turbo-diesel Euro 3 which has 167 horsepower (125 kW) at 2,500 rpm. It has a five speed automatic transmission and a two speed transfer case. One can be carried in a C-160 Transall and two can be carried in a C-130 Hercules. The armoured version can be armed with a 12.7 mm heavy machine gun, or a 20 mm or 30 mm automatic cannon.

- FCLV - Future Command and Liaison Vehicle, a British Army light wheeled armoured vehicle program. Offered by Hunting Engineering in partnership with ACMAT, the FCLV was essentially a modified VLRB. The Iveco contender eventually won the bid process

== Variants ==
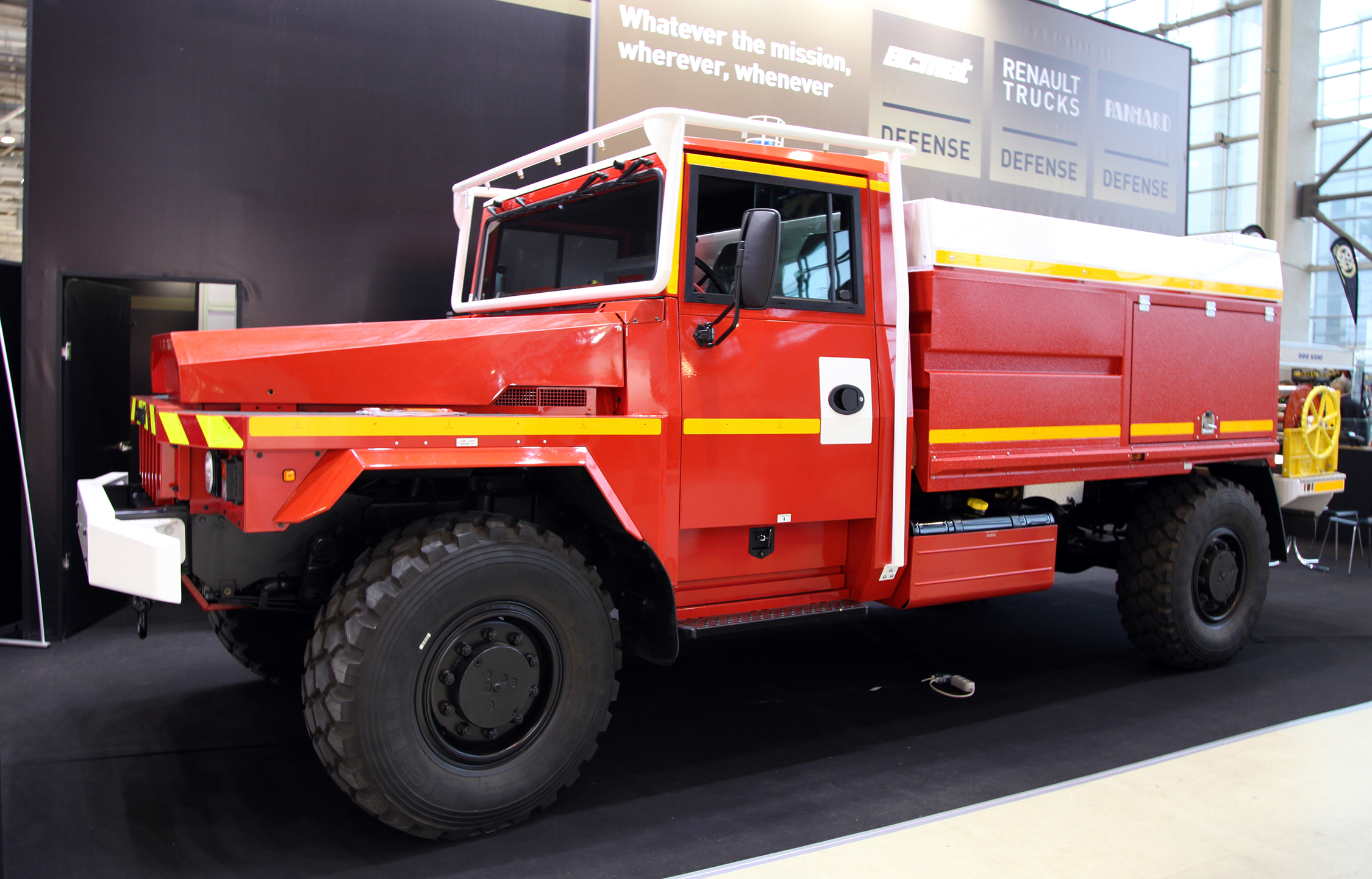
ACMAT VLRA fire appliance

ACMAT offers over 70 variants including the following: command car, commando vehicle, police vehicles, personnel carriers, cargo carriers, ambulances, mortar carrier, weapons carriers, communications vehicles, cross country bus, wireless vehicle, workshops vehicles, vehicles with cranes, fire fighting vehicles, fluid carriers (water and/or petroleum products), semi-trucks, multiple rocket launcher carriers, dump trucks and more.

Options include two or four doors, soft or hard top, manual or power steering, manual or automatic transmission, left or right hand drive, heater, air conditioning, armoured or unarmoured, and NBC defence system. Military users include France, United Kingdom, Ireland, Morocco, Kenya, Cyprus, Zimbabwe, Chile, Chad, Mali and Botswana.

== See also ==
- Panhard
