= ACMAT AVTL =

French military pick-up

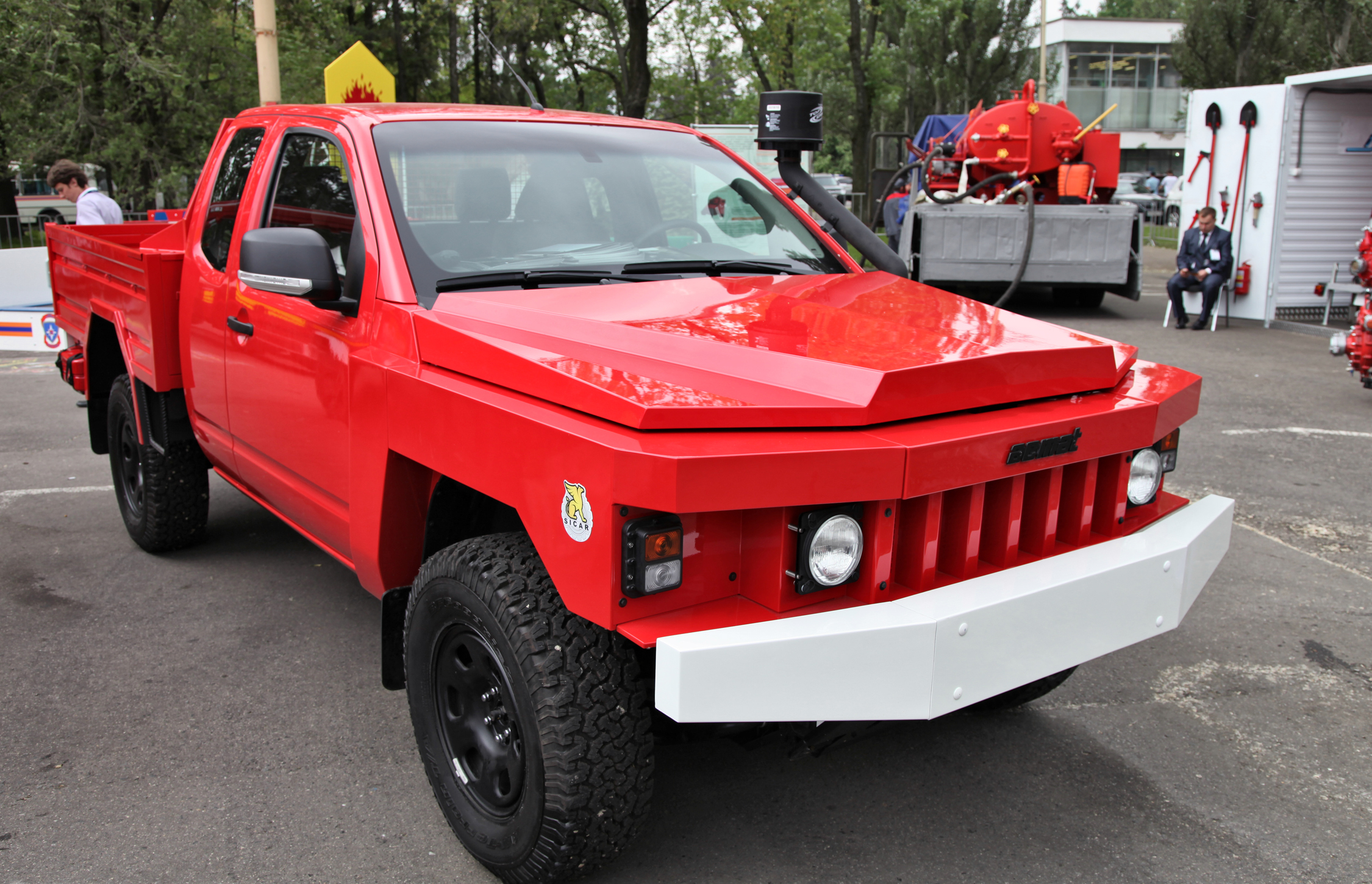
- Place of origin: France/Japan

Service history
- Used by: See Users

Production history
- Designer: ACMAT
- Produced: 2008-2019
- No. built: 1000+ (2014)

Specifications
- Passengers: 10
- Engine: 190 hp (140 kW)
- Suspension: wheeled
- Operational range: 870 mi (1,400 km)
- Maximum speed: 160 km/h (99 mph)

The ACMAT AVTL is a military truck manufactured by the French company ACMAT, now part of Arquus.

== Description ==
The AVTL (French: Aérotransportable Véhicule Tactique Léger, English: Airtransportable Light Tactical Vehicle) is a derivative of the Nissan Navara. It has a payload of 1.4 to 3.5 tonnes, depending on the version.

The AVTL is marketed under several variants, such as station wagon, single cab, double cab or torpedo (open special force vehicle).

== Users ==
More than 1000 have been produced and delivered to 20 countries in 2014.

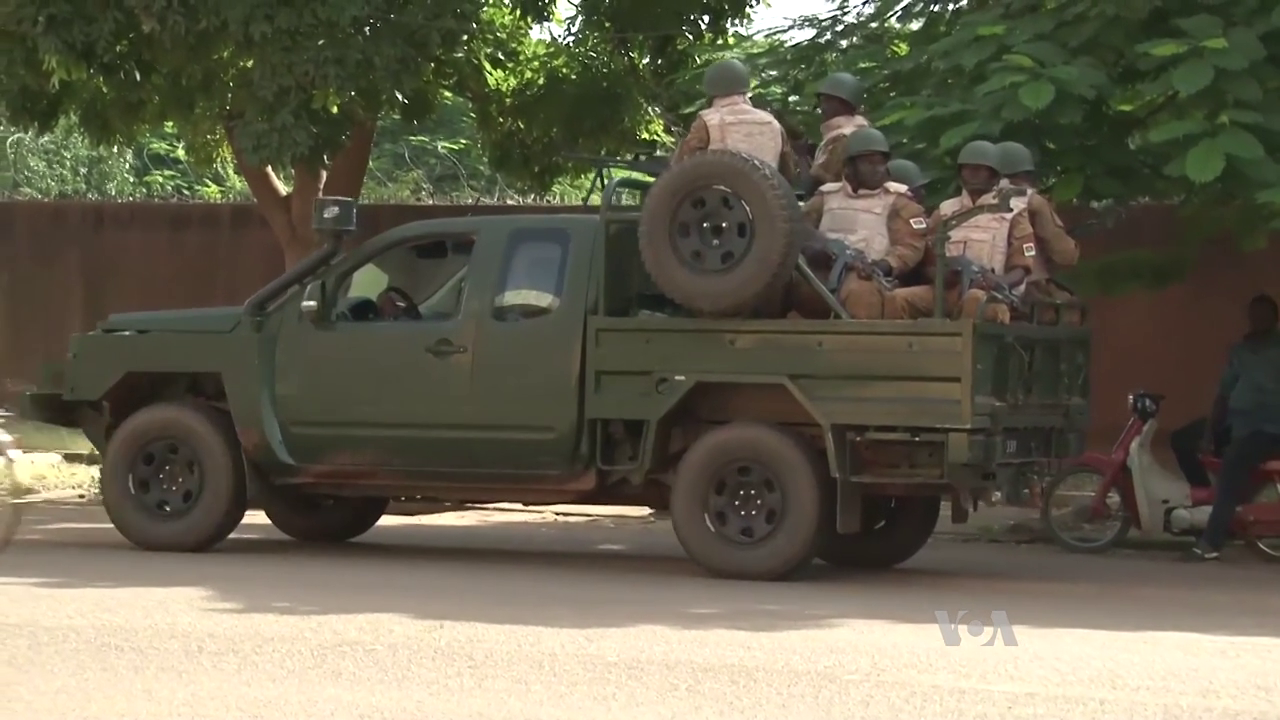
An ACMAT AVTL of the loyalist forces during the 2015 Burkinabé coup d'état.

- Benin
- Burkina Faso
- Chad: 20
- Congo: 14 for the National Police, transport version
- Equatorial Guinea: 48, used by border guards
- Ivory Coast
- Gabon: bought for the contractors of Sovereign Global that trained the Gabonese contingent of the MINUSCA.
- Mali
- Mauritania
- Morocco: armored command-post version
- Niger
- Togo: 44, used by the Togolese Police
