= Rapid Intervention / High Readiness Brigade =

Jordanian special forces unit

Sheikh Mohamed bin Zayed Quick Reaction Force (MbZ QRF)
- لواء الشيخ محمد بن زايد آل نهيان التدخل السريع
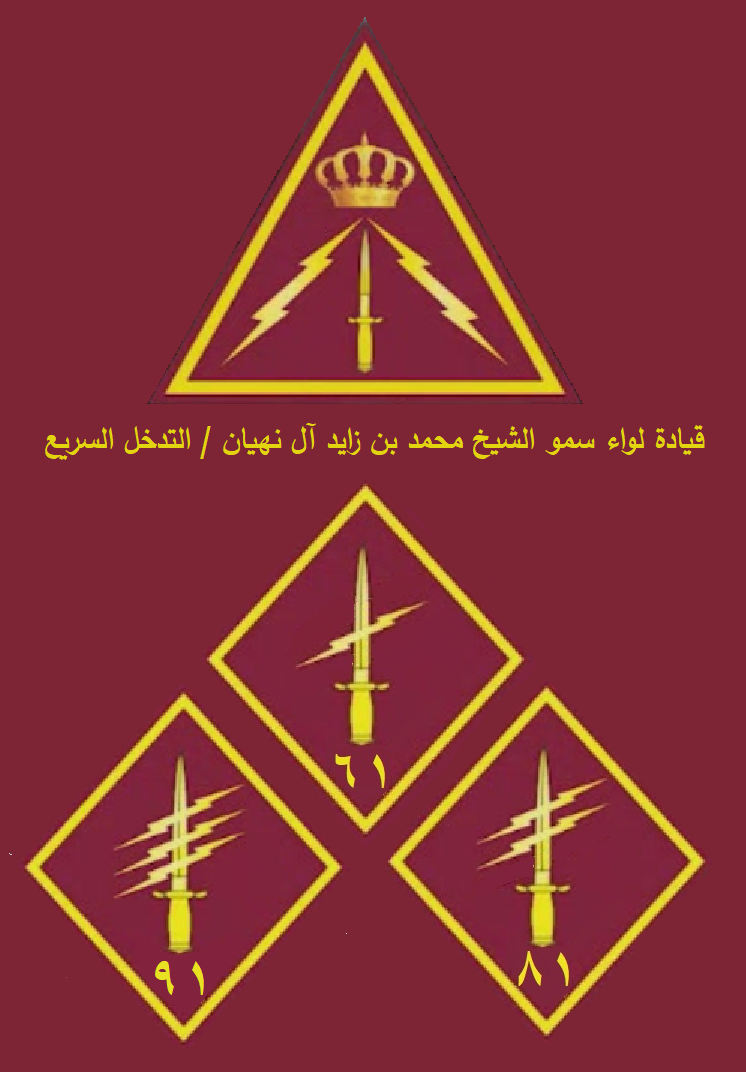
- Emblem of the MbZ QRF Brigade & 61st, 81st, and 91st Quick Reaction Force battalions
- Active: 2014 - present
- Country: Jordan
- Branch: Royal Jordanian Army
- Type: Quick reaction force
- Role: Special Operations; Direct Action; Special Reconnaissance; Search and rescue
- Size: Classified
- Part of: Special Operations & Quick Reaction Force
- Garrison/HQ: Zarqa, Ajloun & Ma'an (Humeima)
- Nicknames: MbZ QRF, Desert Falcon

Commanders
- Current commander: Colonel Ra'ad Dora

Sheikh Mohamed bin Zayed Rapid Intervention / High Readiness Brigade, also known as Mohamed bin Zayed Quick Reaction Force (MbZ QRF) (Arabic: لواء سمو الشيخ محمد بن زايد ال نهيان/التدخل السريع) is a rapid reaction force of the Jordanian Army, part of the Jordanian Armed Forces (JAF).

MbZ QRF was formed after restructure of the Jordan Special Operations Force and consist of the 61st (Raiders), 81st, and 91st Quick Reaction Force Battalions and a Female Engagement Platoon.

MbZ QRF specialize in combat readiness, response speed, flexibility, high mobility and ability to operate independently, within Jordanian forces or with friendly and allied forces, to defend Jordanian national security within the borders of Jordan or outside of it in accordance with the orders of the General Command of the Jordanian Armed Forces. The brigade is named in honor of Sheikh Mohamed bin Zayed, third president of the United Arab Emirates.

== History ==
The brigade was formed on August 1, 2014, as the rapid reaction force (Desert Hawk), then became on 5 November 2017 Rapid reaction Brigade and on June 25, 2018, was renamed under the banner of rapid intervention / high-readiness brigade, which is subordinate to Directorate of joint military operations. In 2017, the units from deactivated 28th Royal Ranger Brigade transferred to QRF Brigade.

In November 2018, the brigade was renamed the "Sheikh Mohammed Bin Zayed Al Nahyan Rapid Intervention/High Readiness Brigade". The renaming was in appreciation of the role of Sheikh Mohammed bin Zayed and the government of the United Arab Emirates in supporting the Jordanian Armed Forces, especially in military housing projects and training schools, according to a Royal Hashemite Court statement.

The headquarters of MbZ QRF was inaugurated on 28 March 2023 by Chairman of the Joint Chiefs of Staff of the Jordanian Armed Forces Yousef Huneiti.

In November 2024, a women's platoon facility at the headquarters of MbZ QRF was inaugurated. The facility was built in partnership with the International Organization for Migration and the government of Canada.

== Mission ==
Jordan has created the brigade to provide a rapid-response capability against situations that may flare up rapidly, particularly along the borders, and to sustain operations for several days. The brigade is an important element in the containment of Daesh and other extremist forces, and both the US and UK have supported this initiative with training and equipment. The Joint Special Operations Command has also taken an important role in shaping the structure and tactical employment of the brigade.

Rapid mobility is a crucial element, and additional Sikorsky UH-60 Black Hawks – which have been in JSOC service for some time – have been procured from the US to allow the immediate deployment of the brigade, along with more land vehicles. Communication is another important area in which new systems are being acquired, allowing Jordan to develop a fully deployable command and control capability. The brigade has its own Joint Tactical Air Controllers (JTACs).

=== Brigade Objectives ===
- Direct and Indirect Action Operations Inside and Outside the Kingdom.
- Assist and Support KA II Royal Special Forces Command.
- Border Area Operations.
- Internal Security Operations.
- Humanitarian Assistance Operations (Refugees - Civil Affairs).

== Structure ==
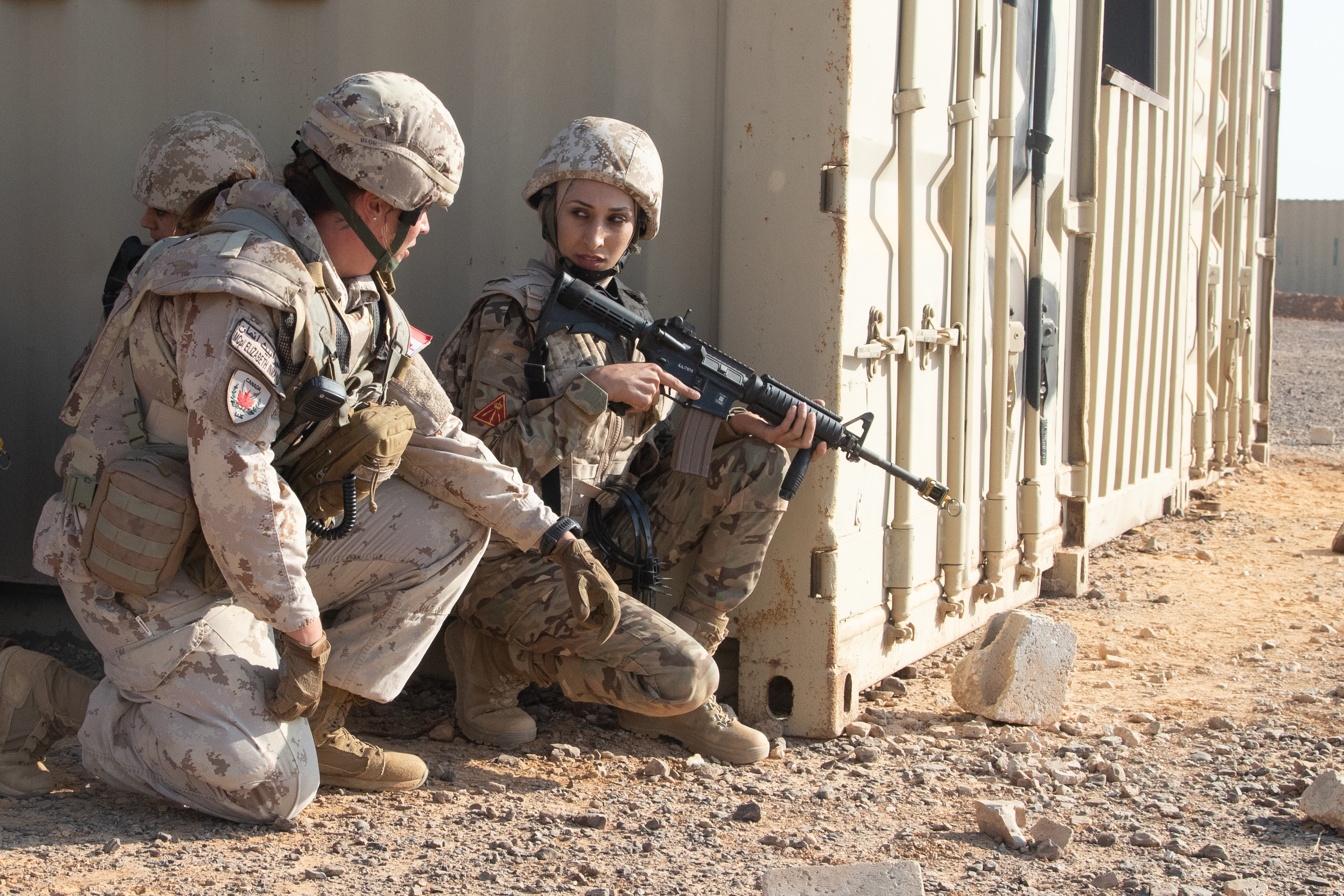
MbZ QRF Female Engagement Team (FET) member with a member of the 1 Canadian Mechanized Brigade during a coalition training exercise near Amman, Jordan.

MbZ QRF is structured into multiple sub units, each with its own specialization.

- Brigade Command HQ
  - Command Staff
  - Signal Company
  - Female Engagement Platoon
  - 105mm Mobile Artillery Company (M119 howitzer)
  - Special Engineer Company
  - Combat Service Support Company
  - Maintenance Unit
  - Medical Support Center
- 61_{st} Quick Reaction Force Battalion (Raiders)
  - Attached to Southern Command
  - The unit is specialized in Direct & In-direct Actions, Mountain Warfare, Advanced CSAR, Special Reconnaissance, Airborne, Air-assault & Maritime Operations.
- 81_{st} Quick Reaction Force Battalion
  - Attached to Northern Command
  - The unit is specialized in Direct & In-direct Actions, Jungle Warfare, Reconnaissance, Airborne, Air-assault & Maritime Operations.
- 91_{st} Quick Reaction Force Battalion
  - Attached to Central Command
  - The unit is specialized in Direct & In-direct Actions, Desert Warfare, Special JTAC, Airborne, Air-assault & Maritime Operations.
- Supporting Arms Virtual Trainer (SAVT) Center.
  - Designed to train JTAC's, Mortar teams, the SAVT provides a fully immersive environment in which virtual aircraft come to life in a large domed building.
- Brigade Training Center
