= Royal Jordanian Army =

- اَلْقُوَّاتُ ٱلْبَرِّيَّةُ ٱلْأُرْدُنِيَّةُ
- Emblem of the Royal Jordanian Army
- Founded: 1920
- Country: Jordan
- Role: Army
- Size: 86,000 (active); 60,000 (reserve)
- Garrison/HQ: Amman
- Colors: KA2 Desert Digital; KA2 Arid/Woodland Digital; KA2 SF Woodland Digital; MultiCam
- Anniversaries: June 10
- Engagements: 1948 Arab–Israeli War; Retribution operations; Six-Day War; War of Attrition; Black September; Yom Kippur War; Iran–Iraq War; 1999 East Timorese crisis; Syrian civil war

Commanders
- Current commander: Lieutenant General Mahmoud Freihat
- Notable commanders: John Bagot Glubb; Abdullah II of Jordan; Hussein of Jordan; Mithqal Al-Fayez; Auda Abu Tayi; Haditha Al-Khraisha

The Royal Jordanian Army (Arabic: اَلْقُوَّاتُ ٱلْبَرِّيَّةُ ٱلْأُرْدُنِيَّةُ; lit. 'Jordanian Ground Forces') is the ground force branch of the Jordanian Armed Forces (JAF). It draws its origins from units such as the Arab Legion, formed in the British Mandate of Transjordan in the 1920s. It has seen combat against Israel in 1948, 1956, 1967, and 1973. The Army also fought the Syrians and the PLO during Black September in 1970.

== History ==
=== Origins – 1920–1947 ===
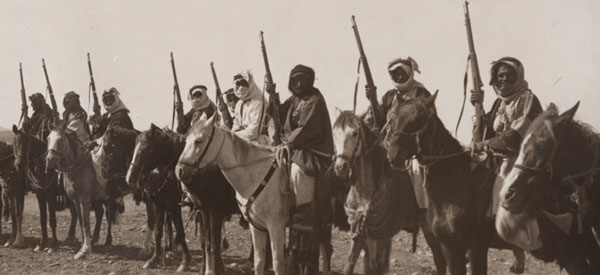
Arab Revolt Tribal Cavalry – Tribes of Jordan and Arabia, c. 1918.

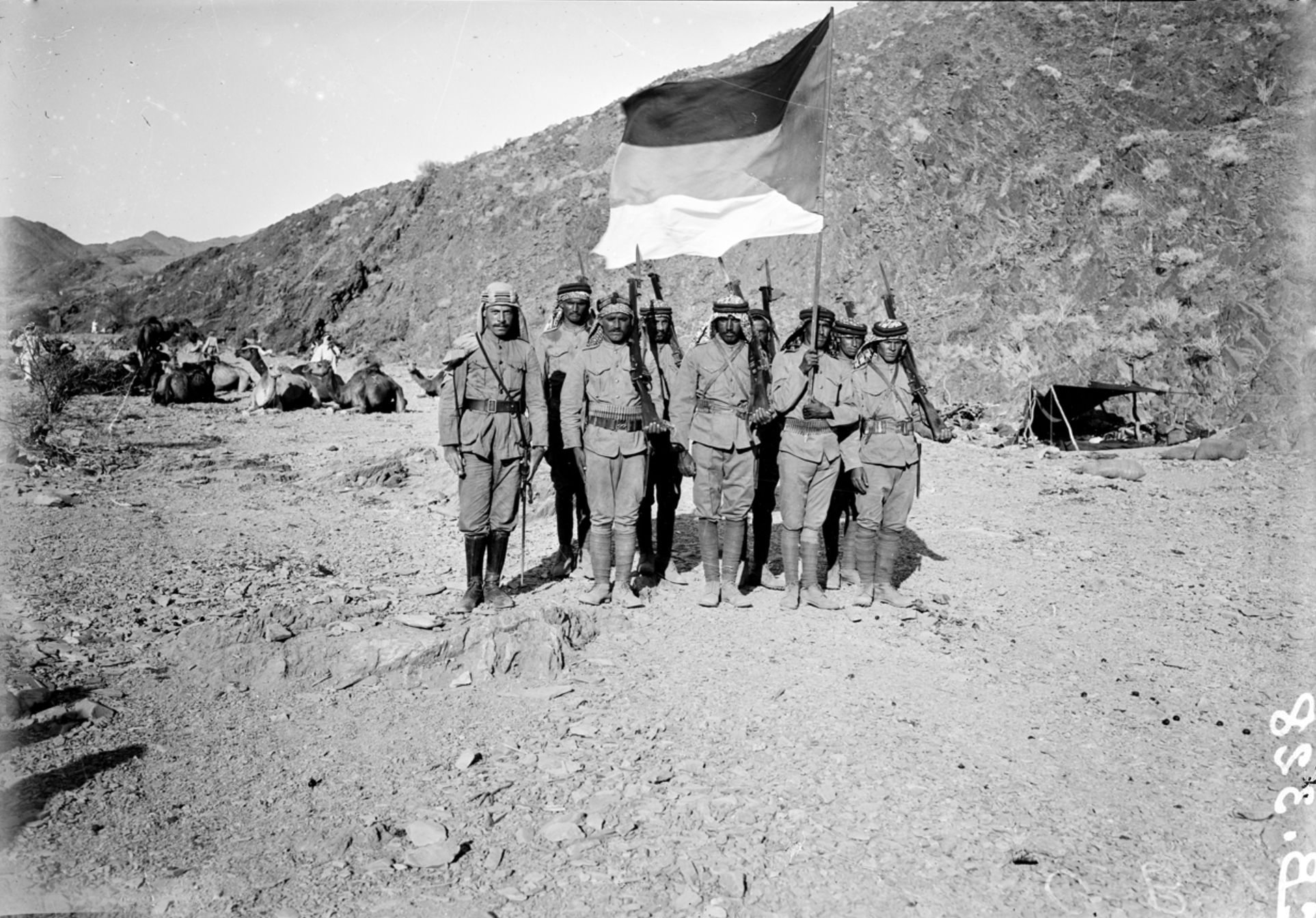
Arab army during the Arab revolt of 1916 against the Ottoman Empire formed the nucleus of the Arab Legion.

On 10 June 1916, Sherif Hussien Bin Ali prince of Mecca, officially declared the Great Arab Revolt against the Ottoman Empire to rid Arab nations of the Turkish rule that had lasted about four centuries.

On 21 November 1920, Prince Abdullah Bin Al-Hussien (later King) arrived at Ma'an, where he expressed his resolution to drive out the Turkish forces from Syria. Later, on 5 December 1920, he proclaimed himself as deputy king in Syria and appealed to members of the Al-Faissali army to join his forces in Ma'an. His calls received much attention in the Arab world as several prominent Arab nationalists and other Arab princes joined his campaign; these later formed the embryonic force of the Arab legion.

When Prince Abdullah came to power in the Emirate of Transjordan, the Jordanian Armed Forces included:

- Gendarmerie (Darak) force of 400 men.
- A mobile (mainly cavalry) force of 150 men and horses.
- A regular Army battalion of some 200 infantrymen.
- A camelry of 100 men.
- An Arab force, which was probably the battalion that had accompanied prince Abdullah to Amman from Ma'an.

Roles of military formations in Jordan from the foundation of the emirate until the 1948 Arab–Israeli War:

- Transjordan Frontier Force: It had played an important role for the United Kingdom during World War II, as it provided protection for British lines of communication extending from Iraq to Soviet Union. It also took part in the fighting against the French forces in Syria.
- The Arab Legion: – During World War II, it was mainly tasked with maintaining law and order in the country. Moreover, it extended support to British Forces engaged in military actions in Syria, Iraq and Palestine. A military detachment of this force participated in the Victory Day ceremonies in London on 8 June 1946, and the victory festival of Allied Forces in Jerusalem.
- The Desert Force (Al-Badia Force): AKA Desert Patrol. Its main task was to guard Jordan's borders with neighboring Iraq, Saudi Arabia and Syria, as well as to provide protection for the petroleum pipelines of the Iraqi Petroleum Company (IPC). Besides that, it participated in the campaigns of Syria and Iraq during World War II.

=== Formation ===
==== Pre-1948 war ====
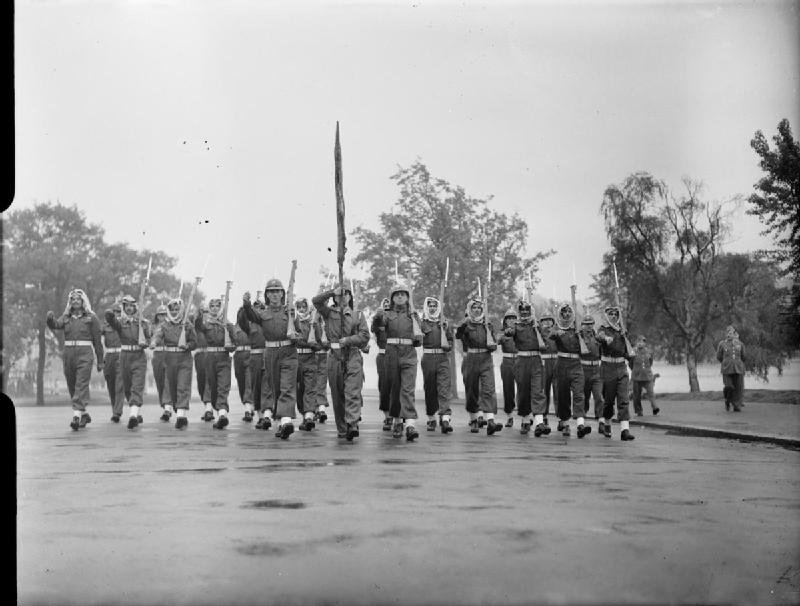
Units from Jordan's Arab Legion take part in the Victory March in London in 1946

This army started with an infantry company, cavalry company, machine guns unit, signal section and military band. In 1923, the total strength of the army, which was under the command of British Captain Frederick Gerard Peake, did not exceed 750 men.

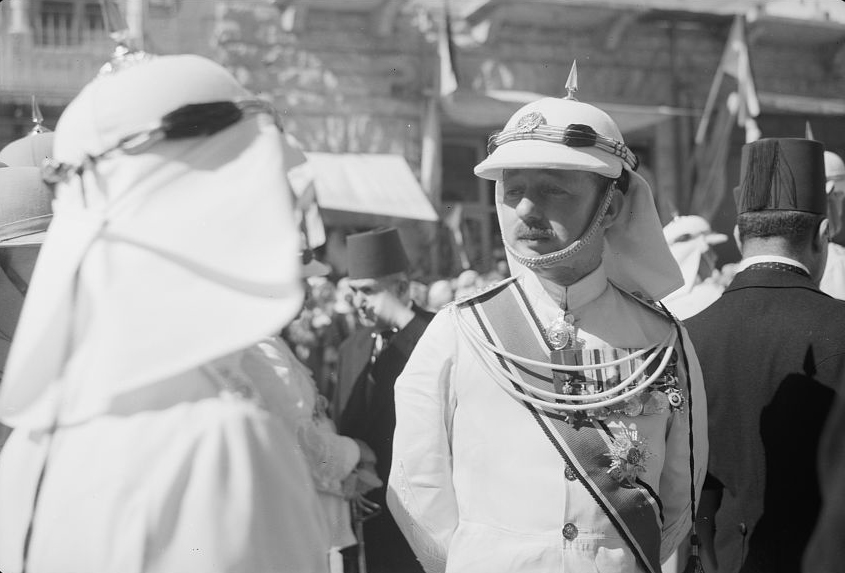
Commander of the Arab Legion, Glubb Pasha in uniform. Amman, September 11, 1940

During 1930, the Arab Legion's strength was expanded to approximately 1,100. In 1931, a camel-mounted desert mobile force was organized under the command of John Bagot Glubb to maintain security and order.

This organization attracted numerous Bedouin volunteers. In 1933, the first mechanized force was formed. This element consisted of three vehicles and 120 men including the camel-mounted desert mobile force. It undertook the responsibility of maintaining security, preventing the raids among the tribal groups and deterring the raids from the outside.

By the eve of World War II, the legion had been expanded to a force of about 1,600 men. This legion took part in operations in Syria during the war. Independent companies were established in addition to a regular battalion, which was later expanded to become the 1st Brigade.

In 1942, the 2nd battalion was formed, which later became the 2nd Brigade. The army continued its expansion in numbers and equipment.

==== 1948 war ====
In 1948, it consisted of two brigades; two garrisons and four battalions were merged to become six battalions. At this time, the army consisted of an infantry division, an artillery brigade, a mortar battery, an artillery battery, an engineer and signal battalion and a field aid unit.

After the announcement of the 1947 UN Partition Plan, and the disclosure of the British decision to leave Palestine on 15 May 1948, both warring sides (the Arabs and the Jews) began to make their military preparations for a forthcoming confrontation they believed would be inevitable.

In May 1948, the Arab countries decided to send their forces to assist the Palestinians. The Arab Legion entered Palestine with other Arab Forces on 15 May 1948 using the Allenby (King Hussein) bridge as they were advancing to cover the approaches from Jenin, in the north to Afula and from Al-Majame'a bridge on the Jordan River to Bissan and from there to Afula.

Units of the Arab Legion were engaged in several battles with the Jewish forces including the following:

- Attacking Ben Shemen convoy at Beit Nabala – 14 December 1947
- Battle of Neve Yaakov settlement- 18 April 1948
- Attacking kibutz Gesher on 27–28 April 1948
- Massacre of Kfar Etzion 13–15 May 1948.
- Occupation of Latrun Tegart fort on 17 May 1948, and later the Battles of Latrun
- Battle for Jerusalem (1948)
- Attacking and conquering Gezer (kibbutz) on 10 June 1948.
- Tarqumiya on 24 October 1948

=== 1949–1967 ===
King Hussein spared no pains at all to improve the army in terms of cadre and equipment, and in the early 1956 dismissed Glubb and Arab commanders assumed leadership posts in the army, most notably Habis Al-Majali.

In 1957, King Hussein ordered the establishment of the 4th infantry brigade and another of field artillery. In 1958, the heavy artillery was entered, In the same year, the Armoured Brigade was reorganized as an Armoured Division and, in 1961, it became the Armour Corps. During this period, the 40th Armoured Brigade, 60th Armoured Brigade and the Royal Guard Brigade were established.

==== Battles – 1956 ====
On 11 September, an Israeli force infiltrated the Jordanian territories in the Al-Rahwa, Hebron sector, and attacked the police station there. After long clashes with a Jordanian unit from the Desert Guards, the Israeli force was forced to withdraw repulsed.

On 10 October 1956, an enemy force, estimated at a motorized infantry brigade, supported by medium-range artillery and 10 combat aircraft, attacked the Arab towns of Hubla, Al-Nabi Illias and Azroun. The assaulting troops fought the Arab legion west of Al-Nabi Illias and were forced to withdraw to Qalqilia hills.

Equipment 1956

Armour

- 24 × (United Kingdom) Charioteer FV4101 Mk.VII medium tanks with 20-pounder gun
- 36 × (United Kingdom) Archer tank destroyers with 17-pdr gun
- 53 × (Union of South Africa) Marmon-Harrington FV Mk.III armoured cars
- 72 × (Union of South Africa) Marmon-Harrington FV Mk.IV armoured cars with 2-pdr gun

Artillery

- (United Kingdom) 2-pdr Anti-Tank Guns
- (United Kingdom) 6-pdr Anti-Tank Guns
- (United Kingdom) 17-pdr Anti-Tank Guns
- Marmon-Harrington 3.7 inch 4×4 self-propelled howitzers
- (United Kingdom) RO 25-pdr towed field guns/howitzers
- (United Kingdom) 2-inch mortars
- (United Kingdom) 3-inch mortars
- (United Kingdom) PIAT light anti-tank rocket launchers

Aircraft

- 16 × (United Kingdom) de Havilland Vampire (9 × FB-9, 2 × T55, 7 × FB52)
- 10 × (United States) NAA AT-6 Harvard
- 5 × (United Kingdom) AOP-3/5
- 6 × (United States) DH-104 Dove
- 10 × (United Kingdom) de Havilland DHC-1 Chipmunk

==== Kuwait – 1963 ====
When Kuwait declared its independence from the Commonwealth on 19 June 1961, the Iraqi government announced that Kuwait was an integral part of its national territories. Following the end of Operation Vantage, the Arab league formed the Arab Emergency Force to protect Kuwait with the participation of Saudi Arabia, Egypt, Sudan, Jordan and Tunisia. The Jordanian participation included an infantry battalion reinforced by an anti-aircraft platoon and returned home on 13 December 1963.

==== Samu incident – 1966 ====
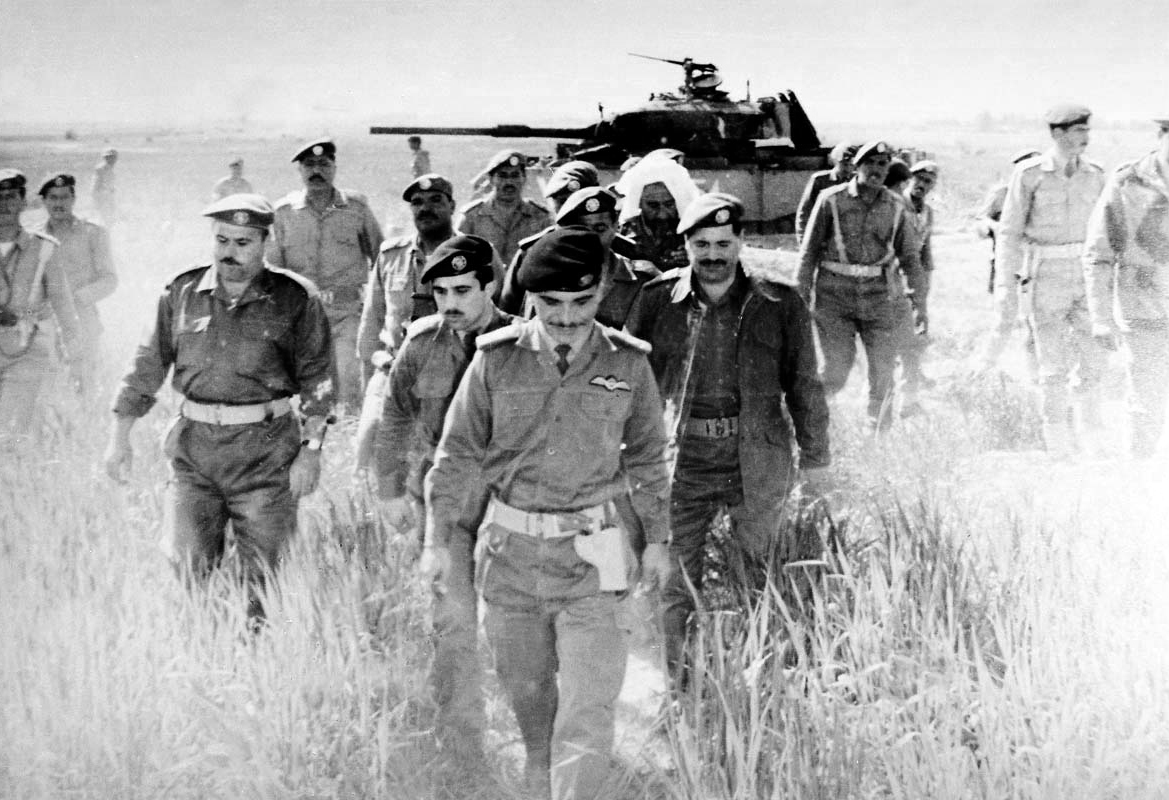
King Hussein after checking an abandoned Israeli tank in the aftermath of the Battle of Karameh.

On 13 November 1966, in response to a Fatah land mine incident two days prior, Israeli forces raided the Palestinian village of Samu (in the Muhafazat of Hebron) with an infantry brigade reinforced by two tank battalions and supported by artillery and combat aircraft. The Jordanian army suffered 16 dead, as well as material damages.

In 1965, King Hussein ordered the formation of five infantry brigades. The army was divided into two fronts: Western front and Eastern front, ten infantry battalions were concentrated on both fronts.

In 1967, a new armoured brigade was established. The artillery brigade was recognized to have consisted of three field artillery battalions and an anti-aircraft battalion.

=== Six-Day War – 1967 ===
Believing that Israel was a becoming more of a threat, Egypt declared a state of emergency and started to concentrate its forces in the Sinai desert. In addition to that, Jordan signed a mutual defense agreement with Egypt. Consequently, Israel ordered the full mobilisation of its forces on 25 May 1967. As a result, the Arab Jordan Army was placed on maximum alert.

The operational Strengths Of Opposing Forces on the Jordanian Front included:

Arab Forces

- Jordan Armed Forces (JAF): several infantry brigades, 2 Armoured brigades and 20 operational combat aircraft, distributed in defensive positions in both western and eastern fronts.
- Iraq: 2 infantry brigades, 1 mechanised brigade, 1 armoured brigade, and 34 aircraft.
- Syria: one infantry brigade crossed the Jordanian border on 7 June, and left on 9 June 1967 without being involved in any military actions.
- Saudi Arabia: one infantry brigade and an armoured company, which arrived at the Al-Modawara border crossing point on 21 March 1968.
- Egypt: 2 Ranger battalions arrived in Jordan on 3 June 1967. Their primary mission was to destroy six Israeli airfields. Due to their late arrival in the occupied territories, they could not accomplish their mission.

Israeli forces opposing the Jordanian front included

- 4 infantry brigades
- 3 mechanised brigades
- 2 paratroop brigades
- 2 armoured brigades with their full standard support elements
- 286 combat aircraft of different types.

When the military operations were over on both Egyptian and Syrian fronts, Israel redeployed a part of its forces from these fronts to the Jordanian front.

At 0730 hrs. on 5 June 1967, the Israelis surprised the Arab states with a series of continuous air strikes directed at Arab airfields. As a result, most of the Arab air force was neutralized.

Amid the battles in Jerusalem was the Battle of Ammunition Hill; 71 Jordanian soldiers died. Eventually, the Jordanian Army was driven from East Jerusalem.

Jordanian Army order of battle, June 1967

- 2 × Armoured Brigades (40/60, Each 96 with Patton M-48/M-48A-1 MBTs, 40 × FV-701 Ferret ARVs, 45 × M-113 APCs, 18 × M-52 105 mm self-propelled howitzers, 18 × M-42 2×40mm self-propelled anti-aircraft guns)
- 3 × Indp. Armoured Battalions (with Centurion MK-V/VII or Patton M-47 MBTs)
- 1 × Paratroop Battalion
- 1 × "Royal Brigade" (Mechanized Infantry)
- 9 × Infantry Brigades (1/2/3/4/12/25/27/29/36)
- 12 × Artillery Battalions
- 6 × Mortar Batteries

Jordanian Air Force order of battle

- Sqn No.1 Hawker Hunter FGA-6/FR-10/T-66 at Mafraq AB
- Sqn No.2 Vampire FB-9/52 T55 at Mafraq & Amman
- Sqn No.3 Dove DH-104/C-47 Dakota/WS-55 Whirlwind at Amman AB
- Sqn No.6 Hawker Hunter FGA9/73 at Amman AB
- Sqn No.9 F-104A/B Starfighter at Mafraq AB
- Sqn No.4 Alouette III/Westland Scout at Amman AB

==== Equipment of Jordanian Armed Forces, June 1967 ====
- (United Kingdom) Lee–Enfield Mk.4 rifle
- (United Kingdom) Sten Mk.4 sub-machine gun
- (United Kingdom) Bren light machine gun
- (United Kingdom) Vickers machine gun (.303 inch.)
- (United States) M1 Garand rifle
- (United States) M1 Carbine
- (United States) M1A1 Thompson submachine gun
- (United States) Browning M1919 A4 machine gun
- (United States) Browning M-2HB .50 cal. machine gun
- (United States) M-20 Super Bazooka
- (United Kingdom) RO 2-inch light mortar
- (United Kingdom) RO 3-inch medium mortar
- 297 × (United States) Patton M-48(197)/M-48A-1(100) 90mm Main Battle Tanks
- 49–160 × (United States) Patton M-47 90mm MBTs
- 90–105 × (United Kingdom) Centurion Mk.V/VII 20-pdr (84.6 mm) MBTs
- 24 × (United Kingdom) Charioteer Mk.7 FV4101 20-pdr (84.6 mm) medium tanks
- 140–240 × (United Kingdom) FV702 Ferret 4×4 armoured reconnaissance vehicles
- 130 × (United Kingdom) FV601 Saladin 76mm 6×6 ARVs
- 150 × (United Kingdom) FV603 Saracen 6×6 AIFV
- 250 × (United States) M-113 armored personnel carriers
- 350 × (United States) M-40A1-C1 106 mm recoilless rifle
- 90 × (United Kingdom) QF 17-pdr (76 mm) Towed ATGs
- 36 × (United Kingdom) Archer 17-pdr (76mm) self-propelled anti-tank guns
- 20 × (United States) M-44 155 mm self-propelled howitzers
- 36 × M-52 105mm SPHs
- 25 × (United States) M-115 203 mm towed guns
- 16–18 × (United States) M-59 Long Tom 155 mm towed guns
- 90–108 × (United Kingdom) QF 25-pdr (87.6mm) towed gun-howitzers
- Brandt 120 mm heavy mortar
- (United Kingdom) 4.2-inch (107 mm) heavy mortar
- (United States) M-42 Bofors twin 40mm SP-AAGs
- (United Kingdom) Land Rover 4WD
- (United States) Ford M-151
- (United States) Jeep M-38
- (United States) Ford trucks
- (United States) Reo M-35
- (United States) M-8 towing tractor for M-59 guns
- (United States) M-88 recovery tank
- 5 × (United States) Lockheed F-104 Starfighter (2 A, 3 B)
- 24–32 × (United Kingdom) Hawker Hunter (FGA.6/9/73, FR.10, T.66)
- 8–16 × (United Kingdom) de Havilland Vampire (FB.9/52, T.55)
- 2 × (United Kingdom) de Havilland Heron
- 6 × (United Kingdom) De Havilland DH104 Dove
- 4–6 × (United States) Douglas C-47 Dakota
- 4 × (France) Sud Aviation Alouette III SA-316B
- 2 × (United Kingdom) Westland WS-55 Srs-4 Whirlwind
- 3 × (United Kingdom) Westland Scout AH MK-1
- Marconi 745 radar system

=== 1967–1973 war ===
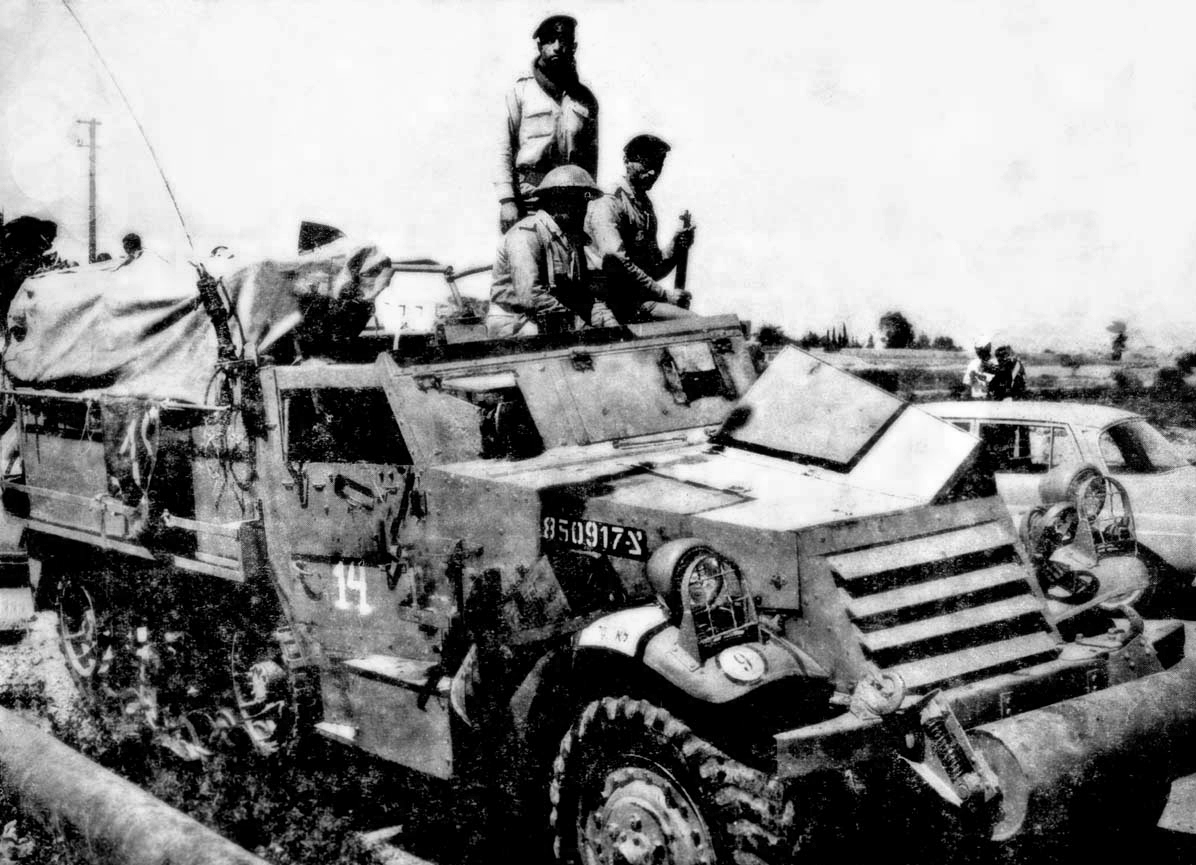
Jordanian soldiers on a captured Israeli half-track

After the 1967 war, the army was rearmed. In 1968, the army defended Jordan against Israeli troops that had invaded Jordanian territory in pursuit of Palestinian guerrillas – the Battle of Karameh. Palestinians claim a victory just for resisting Israeli troops; the Jordanians say that they forced the Israelis back; the Israelis say that they pulled back after hitting the Palestinians at which time they were bombed by the Jordanians.

Daily clashes continued on the Jordanian Front after the 1967 war until the mid-1970s – the War of Attrition. The most famous one was the Battle of Karameh. In 1968, Israeli forces crossed the border and advanced on the town of Karameh. The Jordanian army mobilized and a battle broke out between the Jordanian army and the IDF. The Israeli forces retreated after a heavy bombardment.'

September 1970 is known as Black September in Arab history. In September 1970, King Hussein moved to quash an attempt by armed Palestinian insurgents to overthrow his monarchy. The violence resulted in civilian casualties on both sides. Armed conflict lasted until July 1971 ending only when remaining Palestinian insurgents were surrounded in the Ajloun-Jarash mountains, finally surrendered to the Jordan army and were expelled from the country.' In October 1970, the Ba'athist regime in neighboring Syria had attempted to intervene in support of the Palestinians by sending an armoured column into the north of Jordan. Jordanian ground and air forces were able to halt this advance and a combination of international political pressure and discord within the Syrian military led to a Syrian retreat.

In the 1973 Yom Kippur War, the 40th Armoured Brigade was sent to the Syrian front.

=== After 1977 ===
Since the major reorganisation of 1977, the Royal Jordanian Army has kept the 5th Armoured Division deployed between the Iraqi border and Ramtha on the Syrian border, the 12th Mechanized Division deployed from Ramtha through Umm Qays to the Zarqa River in a defensive posture that covers both Israel and Syria and the 4th Mechanized Division deployed from the Zarqa River, north of As-Salt to the Dead Sea facing Israel. The 3rd Armoured Division acts as both the strategic reserve and the main protection against any internal disturbances. It has units deployed at Zarqa in the north; near the capital Amman (along with a brigade of Royal Guards made up of hand-picked troops from Bedouin tribes known for their long-standing loyalty to the crown), and at Qatraneh in the south covering the route into Saudi Arabia.

In 1996, the Jordanian Army finally established a Special Operations Command, the brain-child of Abdullah (then a serving Army officer). It is tasked to deal with a possible Palestinian uprising and the growth of Islamic terrorism. This powerful force now includes the 71st and 101st Special Force Battalions, the 81st and 91st Paracommando Battalions and both electronic warfare and helicopter support units."

=== 2000s Army ===
The army's organizational structure was traditionally based on two armoured divisions and two mechanized divisions. These have been transformed into a lighter, more mobile forces, based largely on a brigade structure and considered more capable of rapid reaction in emergencies.

Due to the critical position of Jordan (sandwiched between Iraq, Syria, Saudi Arabia and Israel), Jordan maintains a strong defensive army, with four regional commands, the Northern command, the Central Command, the Eastern Command and the Southern Command. As of August 2004, the army was reported to be 88,000 strong, and the Northern Command is reported to consist of (2 mech, 1 infantry, 1 artillery, 1 AD brigade), the Southern Command (1 armd, 1 infantry brigade), the Central Command (1 mech, 1 lt. inf, 1 arty, 1 AD brigade), the Eastern Command (2 mech, 1 arty, 1 AD brigade), and a strategic reserve (1 Royal armoured division with 3 armd, 1 arty, 1 AD brigades). An armoured division has become the core element of a strategic reserve. Each command is controlled by its Field General, but all of the commands are under the King of Jordan's control.

Currently Royal Jordanian Army is restructuring its armoured units, Challenger 1 MBTs equipping four battalions will be replaced by 80 Leclerc donated from UAE and 80 upgraded second-hand Italian Centauro 105 mm 8x8 Mobile Gun Systems by two battalions each, 75 German Marder 1A3 infantry fighting vehicles will replace YPR-765s in two infantry battalions, while the M60A3s will be upgraded and remain in service in four battalions supporting mechanized infantry brigades.

== Command structure ==
Jordanian Army – Major combat units – 2018
large pin – Command, small pin – Brigade

=== Commander-in-Chief ===
His Majesty King Abdullah II is the Supreme Commander of the Jordanian Armed Forces. This authority is vested in the king by the Jordanian Constitution of 1952. He exercises the right to appoint and dismiss all members of the High Command of Jordan's Armed forces, and has the authority to exercise command and control over all units of the armed forces.

=== General Chiefs of Staff ===
The Headquarters of Jordan's military is called the Armed Forces General Command and is located in Amman. This headquarters is under the supervision of the Chief of the General Staff, who is appointed by the king. He exercises general responsibility for the day to day command, control and administration of the military and reports directly to the king as Supreme Commander.

Chiefs of Staff is a group of officers qualified militarily and technically working to advise the commander and assist in decision-making, they translate decision of the commander to orders and instructions and they are responsible for monitoring the implementation and size varies Chiefs of Staff of the unit level and the level of formations and at the level of the General Command represents assistant chairman of the Joint Chiefs of Staff group Chiefs of Staff, as follows:

- Chairman Joint chiefs of staff Deputy
- Logistics Support chief of staff
- Strategic Planning chief of staff
- Joint Operations chief of staff
- Training chief of staff
- Intelligence chief of staff
- Personnel chief of staff
- Defense Resources and Investment Management chief of staff

== Organization ==
The Jordanian Army has Four Regional Commands (Northern, Central, Eastern and Southern), Quick Reaction Force Brigade, Special Forces Group and Special Royal Guard Command.

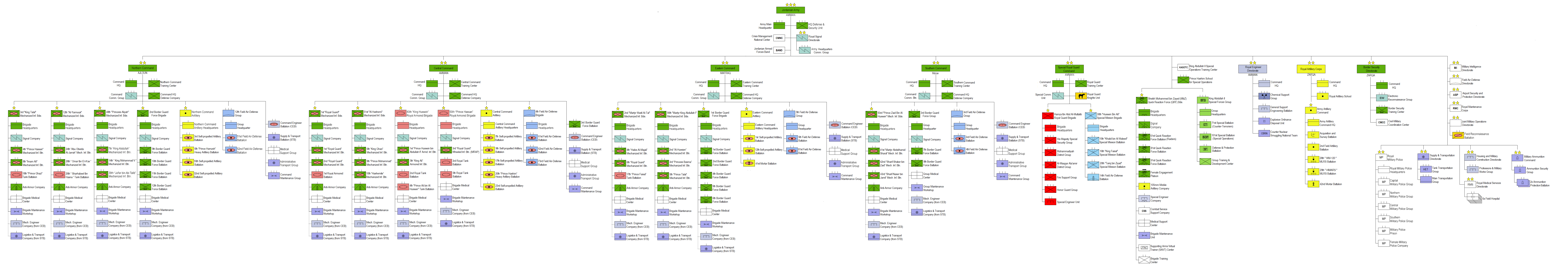
Jordanian Army OrBat 2020

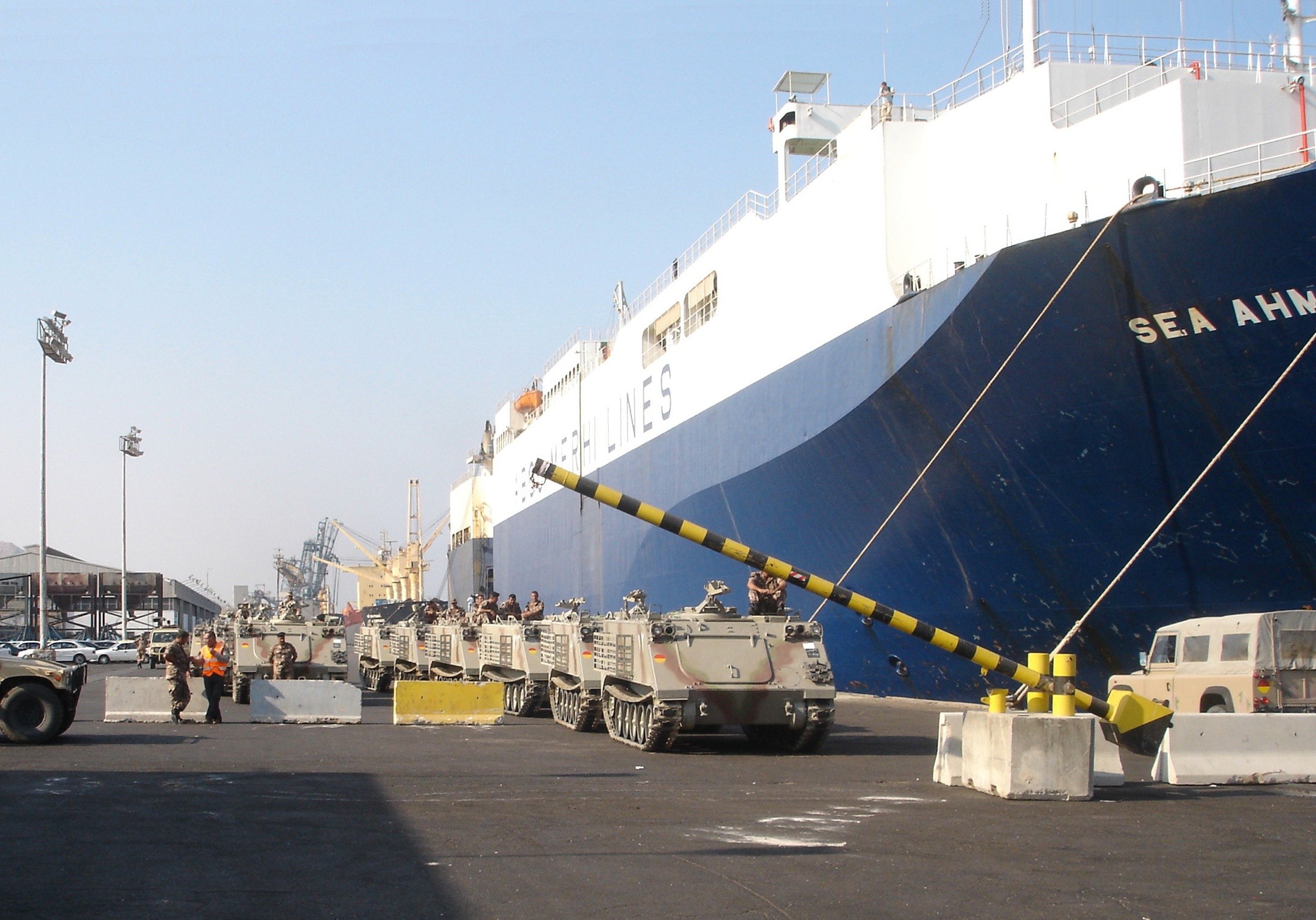
M113 of the Jordanian Army

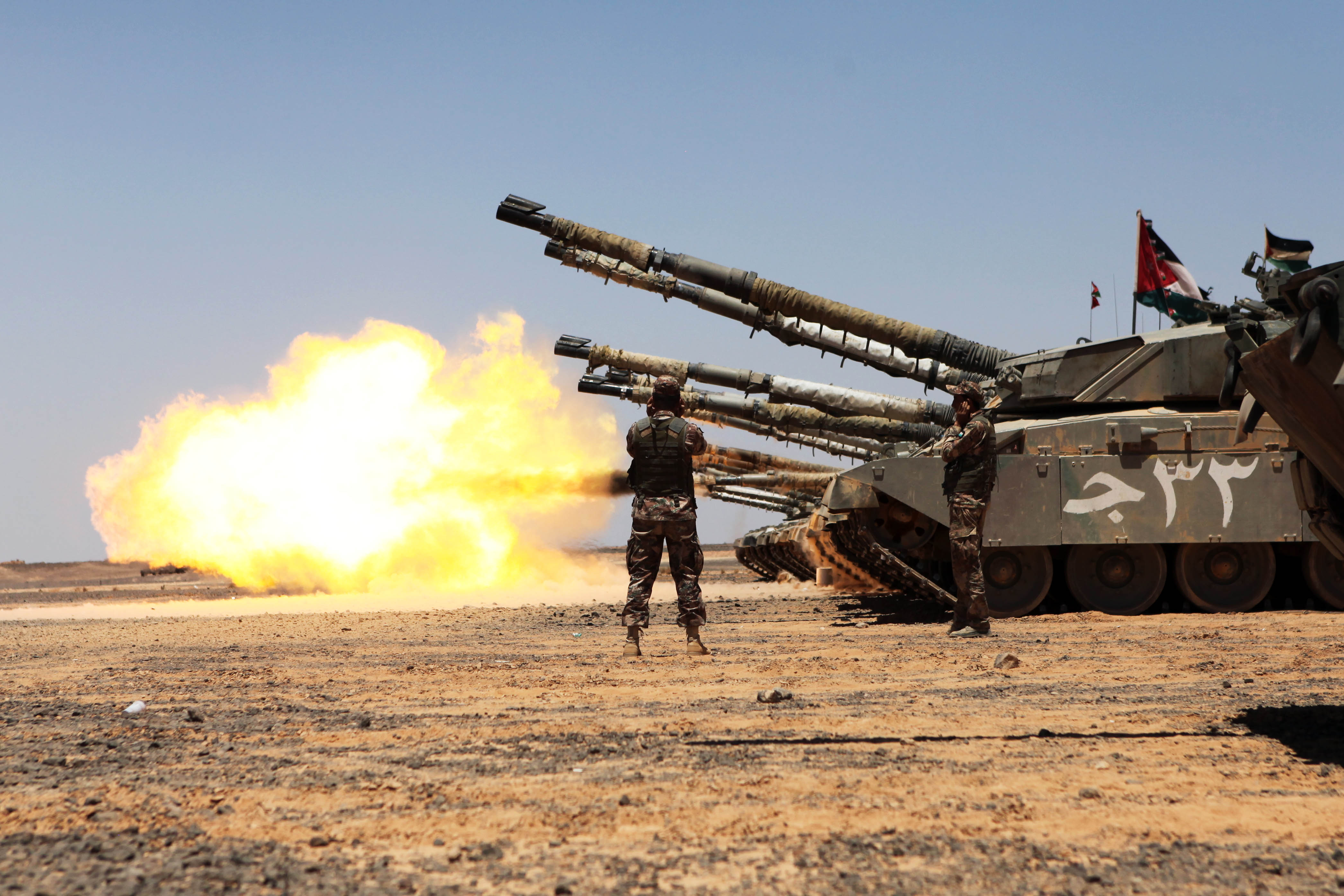
Al-Hussein tanks Firing

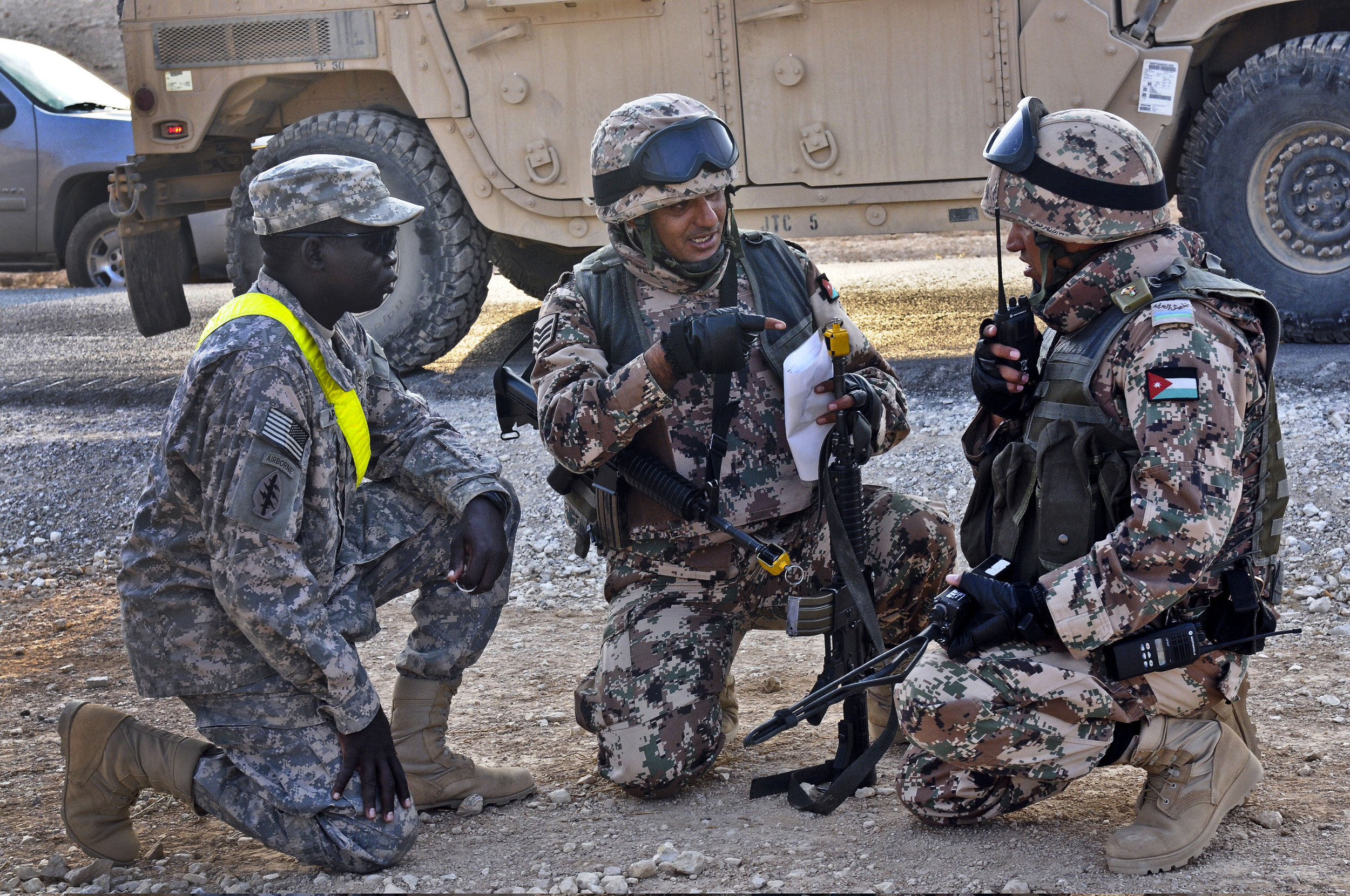
Jordanian soldiers discuss battle strategies with a U.S. Soldier

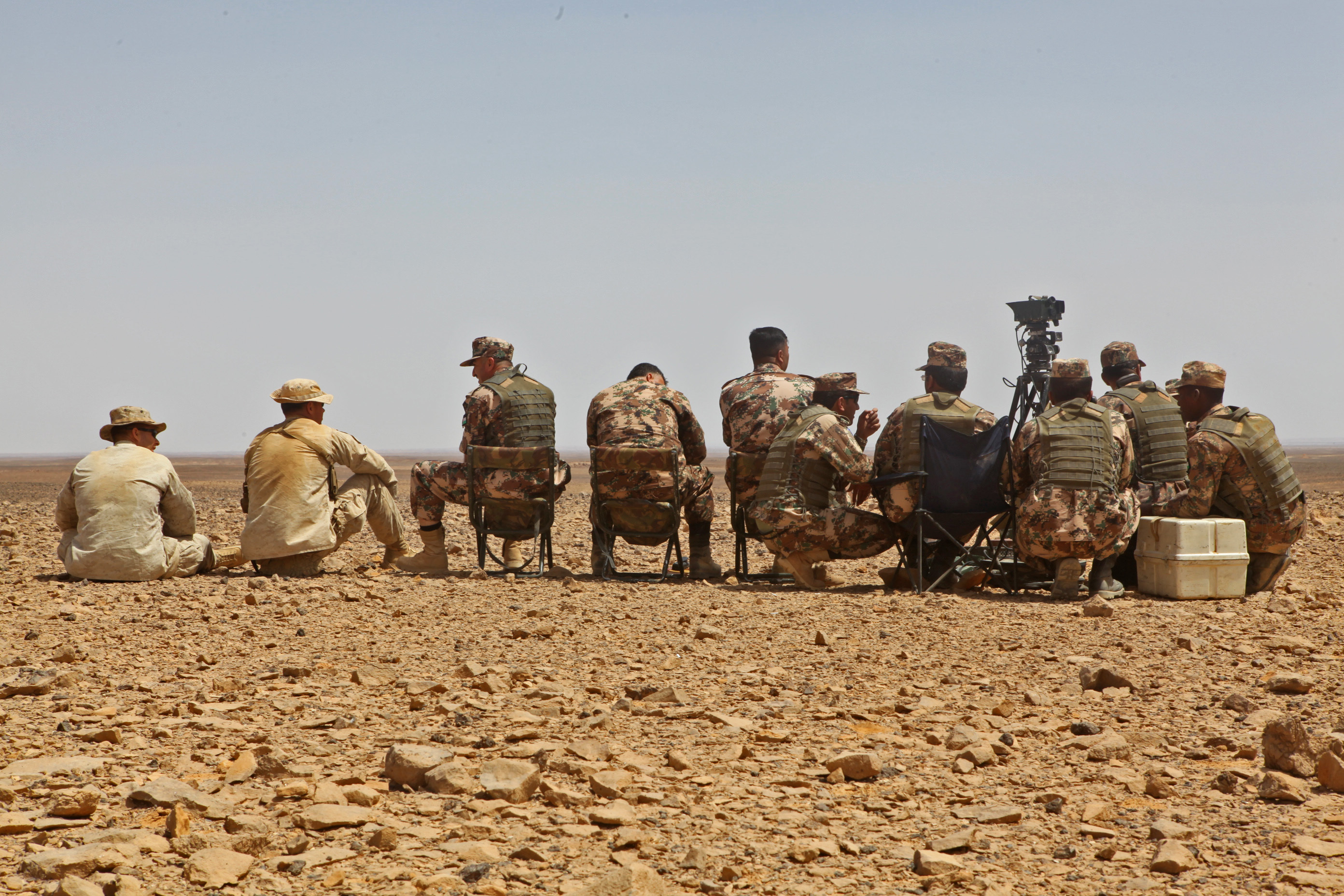
Forward observers from the Jordanian Army

=== General Headquarters (GHQ) ===
Located in Amman

==== Main Directorates ====
- Directorate of Joint Chiefs of Staff
- Directorate of Joint Military Operations
  - Field Reconnaissance "Army Eye" Battalion
- Directorate of Strategic Planning
- Directorate of Planning and Joint Logistic Supply
- Directorate of Doctrine and Joint Training
- Directorate of Military Intelligence
- Directorate Of Information Technology
- Directorate of Military Production
- Directorate of Defensive Procurement
- Directorate of Royal Medical Services
  - 6 Mobile Field Hospitals
- Directorate of Military Survey
- Directorate of International Affairs
- Directorate of Morale Guidance
- Directorate of Housing and Military Construction
  - Professions and Military Works Group
- Directorate of Airport Security and Protection
- Crisis Management National Center

=== Regional Commands ===
The Royal Jordanian Army is organized into four Regional Commands, responsible for territorial defense:

- Northern Region Command
- Central Region Command
- Eastern Region Command
- Southern Region Command

Each regional command typically includes maneuver brigades, artillery, engineers, air defense, and support elements.

=== Major Operational Formations ===
These formations report directly to higher command and are not permanently tied to a regional sector.

- Special Royal Guard Command
- KA II Royal Special Forces Command
- MbZ Quick Reaction Force Brigade
- Al-Hussein Bin Ali 30_{th} Special Mission Brigade

=== Combat Support Arms ===
- Royal Artillery Corps
  - Army Artillery Command
    - Acquisition and Survey Battalion (STA Battalion)
    - 2nd Field Artillery Battalion
    - 28th WM-120 MLRS Battalion
    - 29th HIMARS MLRS Battalion
    - 41st Mobile Mortar Battalion
- Royal Field Air Defense Directorate
  - Royal Air Defense School
- Royal Engineer Directorate
  - Engineering Machinery Group
  - General Support Engineering Battalion
  - Explosive Ordnance Disposal Unit
  - Chemical Support Group
  - Counter Nuclear Smuggling National Team
- Border Security Directorate
  - Electronic Reconnaissance Group
  - Border Security Training Center
- Unmanned Systems Directorate
  - UAS Operations Group
  - Special Unit 252
  - UAS Training Center
- Electronic Warfare Directorate
  - 1st Electronic Warfare Battalion
  - 2nd Electronic Warfare Battalion
  - Counter-UAS EW Group
  - SIGINT & ELINT Units
  - Spectrum Management & Protection Unit
  - UAS, C-UAS and EW test site
  - EW Training Center

=== Combat Service Support ===
- Royal Signal Corps
  - Army Headquarters Communication Group
  - 7th Communication "Signal" Battalion
  - Main Communication "Wireless" Workshops
  - Main Communication "Wireless" Warehouses
  - Sharif Nasser bin Jameel Military Communications College
- Royal Maintenance Corps
  - Prince Faisal Main Workshop (Wheeled)
  - King Hussein Main Workshops (Tracked)
  - Electronic Equipment Workshops
  - Engineering Equipment Workshops
  - Amman Central Workshops
  - Zarqa Central Workshop
  - Maintenance and Driving School (MDS)
  - Prince Al-Hussein Bin Abdullah Military Technical College
- Royal Supply and Transportation Directorate
  - Main Transportation Group
  - Tank Transportation Group
- Military Warehouse Command
- Military Ammunition Command
  - Ammunition Security Group
  - Ammunition Storage and Warehouses
- Royal Military Police Command
  - Royal Military Police Group / Amman
  - Royal Military Police Group / North
  - Royal Military Police Group / Center
  - Royal Military Police Unit / South
  - Military Correctional Facilities
  - Criminal Investigations Team

The Army have a full range of combat and combat supporting corps, including the Royal Maintenance Corps. Today's Jordanian military ranks are based on those of the British Army, given Jordan's military heritage.

The Jordanian military also contributes to UN peacekeeping missions worldwide, having sent contingents to Africa, Afghanistan, Croatia, Bosnia, parts of the former Soviet Union, and even as far as Haiti and East Timor. The Jordanian military has established a regional center of excellence with regards to special forces training, having received training from both the United Kingdom and the United States. Jordanian Special Forces have trained counterparts from Algeria, Bahrain, Iraq, Kuwait, Lebanon, Libya, Morocco, Oman, Qatar, Saudi Arabia, UAE and Yemen.

Kenneth Pollack, a U.S. military analyst, wrote in c.2002 that 'from 1948 to 1956, the Arab Legion was far superior to any of the other Arab militaries. In battle, it generally gave as good as it got, and the Israelis considered it their most dangerous adversary. However, after 1956, the Jordanian capabilities began to decline. In 1967, they performed worse than in 1948, although the exceptional performance of the 40th Armoured Brigade and a number of Israeli mistakes helped disguise the deterioration somewhat. Thereafter Jordanian capabilities continued to gradually erode.'

=== Unit Summary ===
Number	Unit Type	Equipment	Notes
8	Tank Battalion	Leclerc, M60A3 IFCS, B1 Centauro, M88A1 ARV, M577A2, FMTV, Navistar 7000 series	Two battalions per Armoured Brigade, One battalion per Mechanized Brigade (4 Btn. - M60A3 IFCS).
20	Mechanized Infantry Battalion (APC)	YPR-765, M113A2MK-1J, M577A2, YPR-806, Humvee, FMTV, Navistar 7000 series, DAF Military Trucks	
1	Wheeled Infantry Battalion (MRAP)	RG33L MRAP, Humvee, FMTV, Navistar 7000 series, DAF Military Trucks	Royal Guard 3rd battalion subordinate to 60th Armored Brigade, only wheeled Battalion in JAF.
2	Armored Infantry Battalion (IFV)	Marder 1A3, M577A2, Humvee, FMTV, Navistar 7000 series	Both Battalions subordinate to 40th Armored Brigade
11	Border Guard Battalion	MRAP, Humvee, FMTV, Navistar 7000 series, DAF Military Trucks	four battalions per Border Guard Brigade, two battalions in Border Guard Group, one battalion in Central Command
3	Special Mission Battalion	Saxon APC, Humvee, Toyota pickups, Al-Tha'lab LRPV, FMTV, Navistar 7000 series, DAF Military Trucks	15th, 16th, 20th Special Mission Battalions, subordinated to Special Royal Guard Command
3	Rapid Intervention Battalion (QRF)	MRAP, Humvee, Toyota pickups, Al-Tha'lab LRPV, FMTV, Navistar 7000 series, DAF Military Trucks	61st Raiders Battalion, 81st & 91st QRF battalions under MbZ Quick Reaction Force Brigade
3	Special Forces Battalion (SFG)	Humvee, Al-Tha'lab LRPV, GMC Suburban, AL-Jawad MKIV, FMTV, Navistar 7000 series	71st Special Battalion - CT, 101st Special Battalion - Spec. Ops., Defense & protection Battalion under King Abdullah II Special Forces Group
10	Self-Propelled Artillery Battalion	M109A2 Howitzer, M113A2, M577A2, FMTV, Navistar 7000 series, DAF Military Trucks	Two to Four battalions per Command Artillery.
2	Heavy Self-Propelled Artillery Battalion	M110A2 Howitzer, M113A2, M577A2, FMTV, Navistar 7000 series, DAF Military Trucks	After JAF 2017 reform, only two battalions remained in service (One battalion each in Central & Northern Command).
2	Mobile Mortar Battalion	RG-31 Agrab Mk2 Mortar, Humvee, FMTV, Navistar 7000 series, DAF Military Trucks	After JAF 2017 reform, two Mobile Mortar battalions were established.
1	Field Artillery Company	M119A2 Howitzer, Humvee, FMTV, Navistar 7000 series	
2	Rocket Artillery Battalion	HIMARS, WM-120 MLRS, Humvee, M577A2, FMTV, Navistar 7000 series, DAF Military Trucks	28th MLRS (WM-120) Battalion and 29th MLRS (HIMARS) Battalion
1	Target Acquisition Battalion	TPQ-36, TPQ-37, COBRA COunter Battery RAdar, Humvee, M577A2, FMTV, Navistar 7000 series, DAF Military Trucks	
11	Field ADA Battalion	Strela-10, ZSU-23-4 Shilka, 9K38 Igla, FMTV, Navistar 7000 series, DAF Military Trucks	Two battalions per AD Group, four battalions in the 4th AD Brigade, Special AD Battalion subordinate to Royal Guard Command.
4	Military Police Group	Humvee, Toyota land cruiser	Northern, Central, Southern, Capital Military Police Groups
5	Engineer Battalion	M113A2, Armoured Tracked Bulldozer (CAT D6T, D7G/R, D8R, D9, Komatsu D155A), Wheeled Bulldozer (CAT 924H, 966C/D/F/G/H, Komatsu WA300-1, WA320, WA380-3A, W470-3), excavators, graders (CAT 12G, 120M), dump trucks, Backhoe loaders, loaders, M58 MICLIC, Aardvark JSFU, FMTV, Navistar 7000 series, DAF Military Trucks, Combat Dozer UDK1 and Bomb disposal robots.	One Engineer Battalion per Command and General Support Engineering Battalion
5	Supply & Transport Battalion	FMTV, Navistar 7000 series, DAF Military Trucks, Fuel Tankers, Toyota Trucks and many other vehicles.	One Supply & Transport battalion per Command.
5	Command Communication Group	M577A2, M113A2, MRAP, Humvee, FMTV, Navistar 7000 series, DAF Military Trucks	One Group per Command, one Group for Army Headquarter.
4	Medical Support Group	M577A2 Ambulance, M113A2 Ambulance, HMMWV M997 Ambulance, Toyota Land Cruiser Ambulance, Mobile Field Hospitals on trucks	One Medical Support Group per command.
5	Maintenance Group	M113A2, M88 Recovery Vehicle, M578 Light Recovery Vehicle, AL Monjed ARV, Chieftain ARV, YPR-806, M109 Van, M35 Trucks, M800 & M900 Trucks, DAF Military Trucks	One Maintenance Group per command.
5	Administrative Transport Group		One Administrative Transport Group per command.
1	AFV Transporter Group	Heavy Equipment Transport System	Used to transport heavy equipment and armoured units.
1	Main Transportation Groups	FMTV, Fuel Tankers, Water Tankers, Toyota Trucks and many other vehicles.	
1	Electricity & Water Group		
1	Electronic Warfare Group		
1	Chemical Support Group		

== Training ==
Volunteers and conscripts receive 14 weeks of basic training in military skills and discipline. This is followed by more advanced training in weaponry and various specialities, such as artillery, communications and engineering, after the recruit is assigned to a permanent unit. Soldiers who qualify for promotion undertake courses at a general NCO school. They may then avail themselves of courses in more specialised centres where there is training in armour, artillery, engineering and logistics. Special Forces personnel are trained in a branch of the infantry school.

Officer cadets are trained at the Mutah Military University, which was established in the town of Mutah, south of Amman, in the 1980s. A cadet who successfully completes the four-year course is commissioned as a second lieutenant. Advanced courses for officer training are provided at two centres near Amman – the Jordanian Staff College and the War College. Generally, officers from senior captain to lieutenant colonel attend the Staff College, where they can earn a BA degree in military science, while more senior officers study at the War College, where a master's degree is offered.

Many Jordanian officers study abroad – at the US Army General Staff College, or at the British Army Staff College, and many Jordanian cadets have graduated from the UK's Royal Military Academy, Sandhurst. Members of the Jordanian royal family have a tradition of attending Sandhurst. The late King Hussein graduated from the college in 1952; he was followed by his son, the present ruler King Abdullah in 1981; his daughter Aisha, now head of the Royal Jordanian Army Women's Corps, in 1987; his son Prince Ali in 1994; Crown Prince Hamzeh in 1999 and Prince Hashem, half-brother of King Abdullah, in 2000. In addition, both officers and non-commissioned officers attend specialised courses abroad.

The British Government arranges for senior Jordanian officers to attend the Royal College for Defence Studies in the UK. Britain's special relationship with Jordan has remained strong – this was underlined by the provision by the British Army of two short-term training teams to Jordan to advise and oversee the transition and the conversion training of the Jordan Armed Forces on the Al-Hussein/Challenger 1 tanks supplied as part of Britain's military assistance to the kingdom.

British and Jordanian units regularly carry out joint training exercises in Jordan. The kingdom provides British Army units based in Cyprus with the opportunity to train in a desert environment, alongside Jordanian units. It has become a regular practice for two British Army infantry battalions based in Cyprus to exercise in Jordan every year between August and October. The US has provided significant assistance towards the training of Jordanian military personnel. Under the US International Military Education and Training Program (IMET), US$2 million was allotted to the training programme for Jordan in 2002, making it one of the largest IMET programmes of its kind in the world.

The 2002 IMET grant facilitated the training in the US of more than 200 Jordanian military personnel. Jordanian personnel are trained to a very high standard and Jordan's military training has a very high reputation in the Arab world, to the extent that many Arab states (as well as states beyond the Arab world) have sent personnel to be trained at Jordan's military schools. In recent years, personnel from the following countries have been to Jordan for military training: Bahrain, Egypt, France, Lebanon, Oman, Qatar, Pakistan, South Korea, Tunisia, Yemen and the United Arab Emirates.

Secret military exchanges between Jordan and Taiwan, which had been going on for many years, were revealed in late 1999 after a Jordanian army NCO was killed in a parachute accident in Taiwan. Jordan has diplomatic relations with China but none with Taiwan. Reports in November 1999 indicated that Jordan sent two groups of about 10 servicemen to Taiwan every year for intensive military training, which included parachuting sessions in Pingtung County's Tsochou township, where the accident happened, jungle combat drills in Taichung County's mountainous Kukuan area, as well as winter training in the snow in Taiwan's Central Mountain Range. It was revealed that military exchanges between the two countries began in the mid-1950s, when Taiwan sent instructors to Jordan to help train its F-5 fighter pilots.

The quality of instructors from the Special Operations Command (SOCOM) is highly regarded abroad, especially in the Arab world. SOCOM instructors have been providing training in Jordan to special operations troops from a range of Arab countries, including Saudi Arabia, Bahrain, Qatar, Oman, Kuwait, Libya, Algeria, Morocco and Lebanon. It is understood that Jordanian instructors have also provided training in the UAE to that country's troops. In April 2002, Jordanian special operations instructors left for Yemen to assist US forces in training Yemeni special forces to fight terrorism.

Jordan has set up a centre specialising in training for special operations personnel. The King Abdullah Special Operations Training Centre is based at Yajooz, Amman.

In April 2004 the Jordan Armed Forces (JAF) established a new committee to further its plans for the creation of a unified national training centre. It was proposed that this combined arms training centre would group together simulation equipment for training infantry, armour and artillery personnel, from the individual to the collective training stages.

Training Areas

- Artillery and Armour training takes place in the desert area to the east of Amman and southern desert.

== Equipment ==
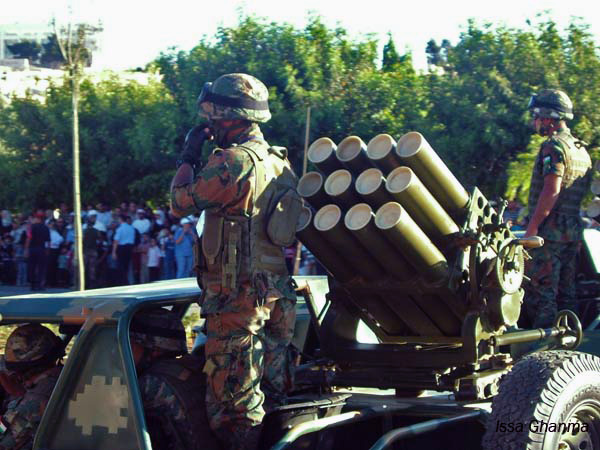
Jordanian troops at a military parade in Amman

The present day Jordanian Army is equipped with mainly Western (US and British) supplied weapons.

The Jordanian Army is equipped with a mix of British and American tanks, including the Al-Hussein, Khalid and M-60 Phoenix. The older Centurion tank and M-48A5 series are phased out, as the Challenger and M-60A3 undergo further upgrades.

Current projects carried out by Jordan Design and Development Bureau (JODDB) include integration of the Phoenix digital fire and control system and a revised turret for the M-60A3 (featuring ERA of unknown origin) along RUAG L50/52 Smooth-bore Compact Gun to replace the Rifled 120mm L15A1 and 105mm L7/M68 gun of the Challenger 1 and M-60A3 respectively. The Projects have also been offered for export and existing M-60 users such as Egypt or Saudi Arabia have shown interest in KADDB.

The M113A2MK-1J remains a standard APC and are being supplanted by AIFV and local vehicles, including the MAP II and Al-Temsah (Crocodile, an APC conversion of a Centurion tank chassis). 24–28 AH-1S/F 'Cobra' equip Army aviation and are equipped with TOW II ATGW and capable of night-time operations since been upgraded. Earlier the Bofors 40 mm gun was also used.

Personal Equipment includes the US-supplied M-16 rifles (mainly A2 and some A3/A4), M-4A1, Taiwanese T65 assault rifles and T86 carbines, Browning HP automatic pistols; however, some units utilise the relatively uncommon Beretta Italian SS70/223 (the standard carbine of the Public Security Department and Police Force). The M-60 and FN-MAG are carried as the GPMG. The Badia forces generally carry the M-14 on camel back.

== Insignia ==
The military ranks of Jordan are the military insignia used by the Jordanian Armed Forces.

=== Commissioned officers ===
The rank insignia for commissioned officers for the army, navy and air force respectively.

Rank group	General / flag officers					Senior officers			Junior officers
Royal Jordanian Army
Royal Jordanian Army	مشیر; Mushir	فريق أول; Fariq 'awal	فريق; Fariq	لواء; Liwa	عميد; Amid	عقيد; Aqid	مقدم; Muqaddam	رائد; Ra'id	نقيب; Naqib	ملازم أول; Mulazim awwal	ملازم; Mulazim

=== Enlisted ===
The rank insignia for enlisted personnel for the army, navy and air force respectively.

Rank group	Senior NCOs				Junior NCOs	Enlisted
Royal Jordanian Army							No insignia
Royal Jordanian Army	وكيل أول; Wakil 'awal	وكيل; Wakil	رقيب أول; Raqib 'awal	رقیب; Raqib	عريف; Earif	جندي أول; Jundiun awwal	جندي; Jundiun
