= Special Operation Forces (Jordan) =

King Abdullah II Royal Special Forces Command
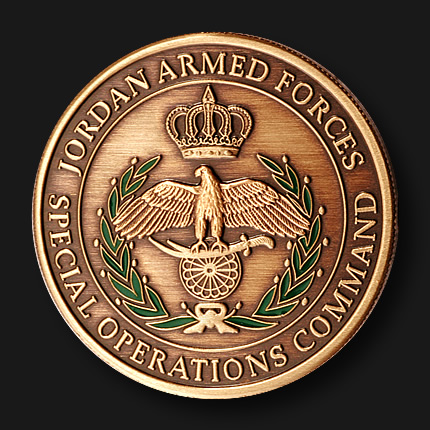
- King Abdullah II Royal Special Forces Command
- Active: 1963 - Present
- Country: Jordan
- Branch: Royal Jordanian Army
- Type: Special Operations Forces
- Size: N/A
- Part of: 101st SFB, 71CTB, 51 SSB
- Garrison/HQ: Amman
- Color of Beret: Maroon

King Abdullah II Royal Special Forces Command (Arabic: قيادة قوات الملك عبدالله الثاني الخاصة الملكية), are strategic-level special forces of the Royal Jordanian Army under the Jordanian Armed Forces (JAF). Founded on April 15, 1963, on the orders of King Hussein, its primary roles include reconnaissance, counter-terrorism, search and evacuation, intelligence gathering combat, and the protection of key sites. The KA II Special Forces Command are also charged with carrying out precision strikes against critical enemy targets. The unit is equipped and trained to be able to operate behind enemy lines for long periods without any logistical support and is considered some of the best in the Middle East.

== History ==
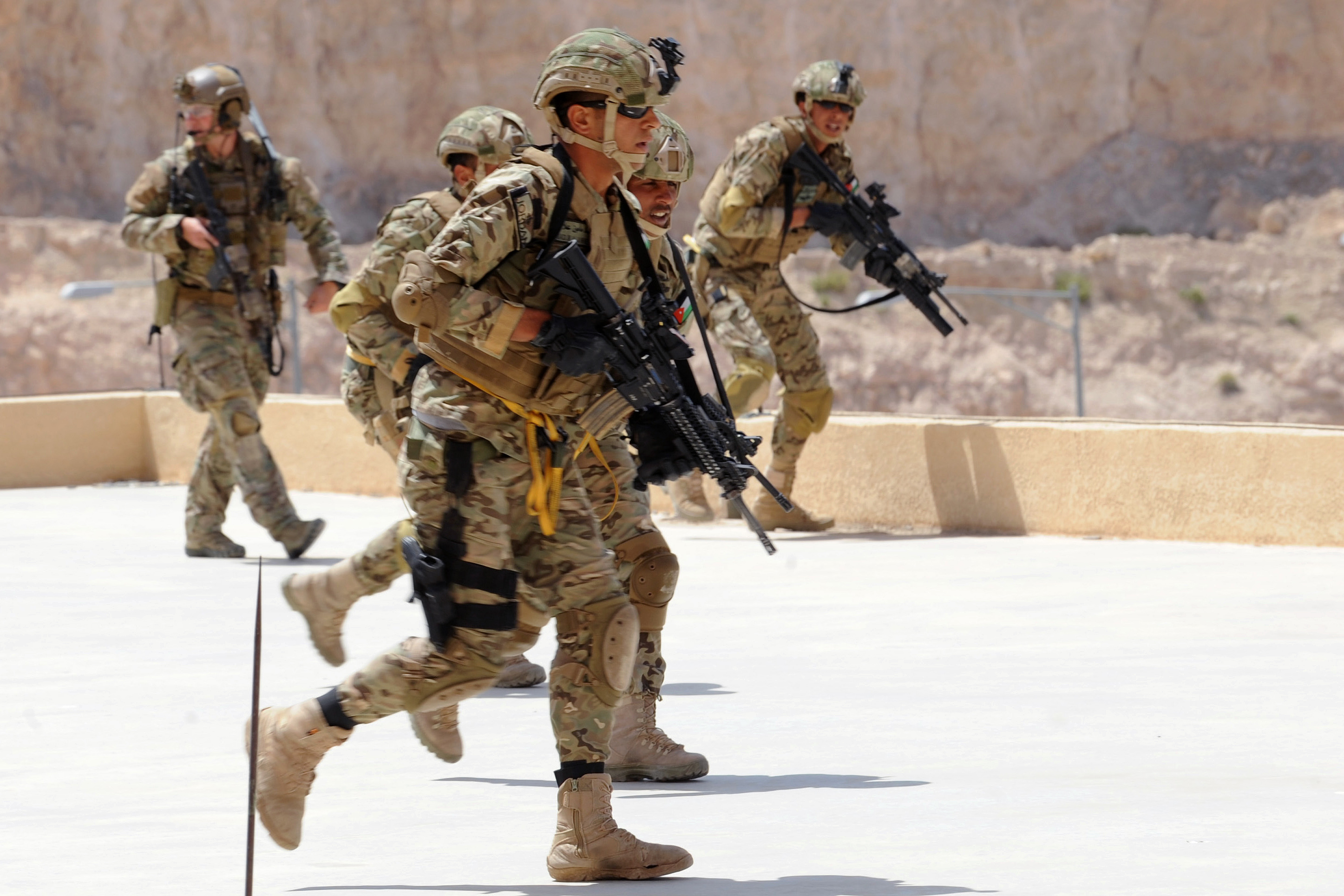
Jordanian Special Forces troops

Since its establishment in 1963, the Jordanian special operations forces were meant to be flexible and dynamic, in order to successfully face the ever-changing threats to Jordan national security. Their organizational structure has evolved significantly over the past half-century, as internal and external threats changed.

Jordanian special operations forces evolved from a multi-task company-size parachute unit in the early 1960s to brigade-size in the early 1980s, with more specialized units, including a parachute unit, special forces unit and a small counter-terrorism unit.

With the beginning of this century and the emergence of new threats to national security, Jordan established paramilitary troops—the Gendarmerie. The military force was, and remains, tasked with countering homeland security threats, thus allowing the Special Operations Forces to focus on homeland defense threats. Therefore, the concept changed accordingly, from special operations to joint special operations.

The previous organization of the Royal Joint Special Operations consisted mainly of three main brigades with all standard support and service units that facilitate operations and training.

- The Special Forces Brigade consists of a special forces group, a counter-terrorism battalion, and a combat search-and-rescue battalion. This brigade is mainly equipped and trained to successfully fight unconventional threats, with a good capability to also face conventional ones.
- The Rangers Brigade is more geared towards fighting conventional threats, with good capabilities to support internal security operations.
- The Special Operations Aviation Brigade provides the joint task forces with mobility, timely response capabilities, and insertion platforms, especially for the counter-terrorism teams.

=== 2017 reform ===
In the summer of 2017, the chairman of the Joint Chiefs of Staff Lieutenant General Mahmoud Freihat launched a package of reforms across JAF—many of which appeared to be driven by budgetary constraints. The reforms included specific initiatives that have significantly changed the shape of the Jordanian special operations community. The first measure deactivated the Joint Special Operations Command headquarters and downgraded the highest-ranking special forces commander from a major general to a colonel-rank officer. The second measure transformed the 28th Royal Ranger Brigade out of special operations and re-organized it as the Rapid Intervention / High Readiness Brigade. The third initiative removed the 5th Aviation Brigade from special operations and transferred it to the Jordanian Air Force. While the brigade's aircraft and pilots now fall under air force control, it has been assigned a direct support role to the King Abdallah ll Special Forces Group. The fourth initiative has seen the creation of the Directorate of Special Operations and Rapid Intervention. This directorate, which forms part of the general staff of the army, is in charge of JORSOF and the Rapid Intervention / High Readiness Brigade.

=== 2024 reform ===
The result of reforms is to condense a three-brigade Joint Special Operations Command down to an army-specific command — known as the King Abdullah II Royal Special Forces Command. At the heart of the Command are the 101st SOF, 71st CT battalions and the 51st Special Support Battalion. JORSOF is supported by the Mohammed bin Zayed (MbZ) Quick Reaction Force (QRF) Brigade.

There are similar units to the special operations units like the Special Gendarmerie's Unit 14 (SWAT unit) & Special Police's Unit 30 (SWAT unit) . With the need for surrounding countries to develop modern forces, Jordan has become a centre of experience and specialized training for special forces. As an established regional centre for special forces training, Jordan has trained forces from Algeria, Bahrain, Iraq, Kuwait, Lebanon, Libya, Morocco, Oman, Qatar, Saudi Arabia, the UAE and Yemen.

== Objectives ==
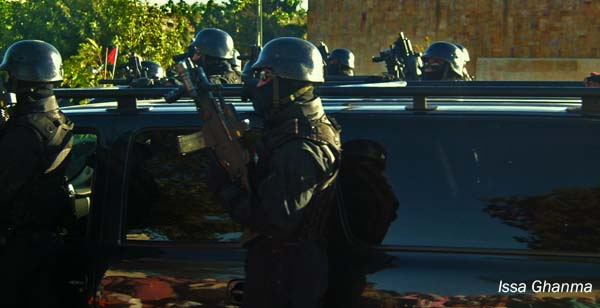
Jordanian 71st Special Battalion

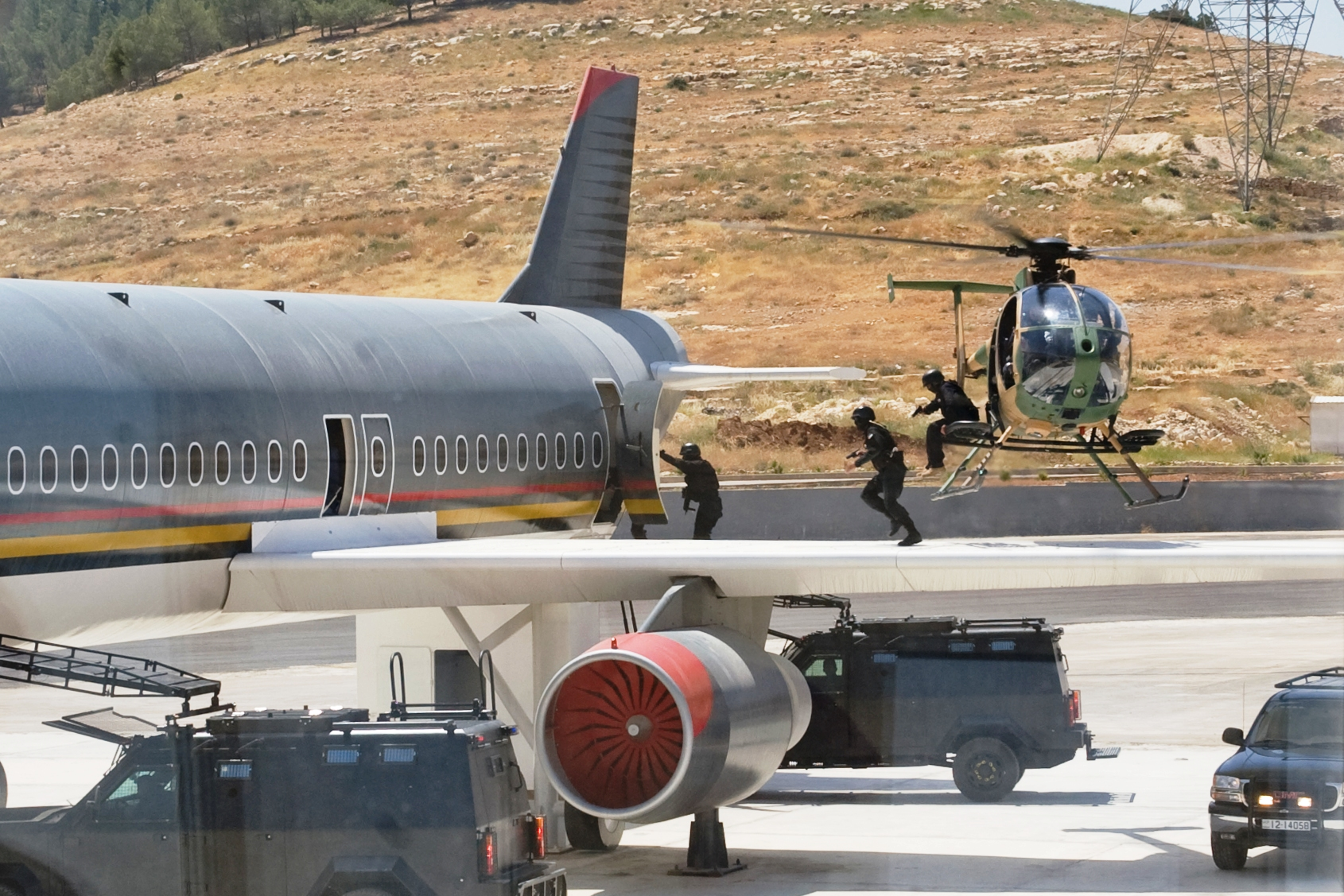
Jordanian Special Operators

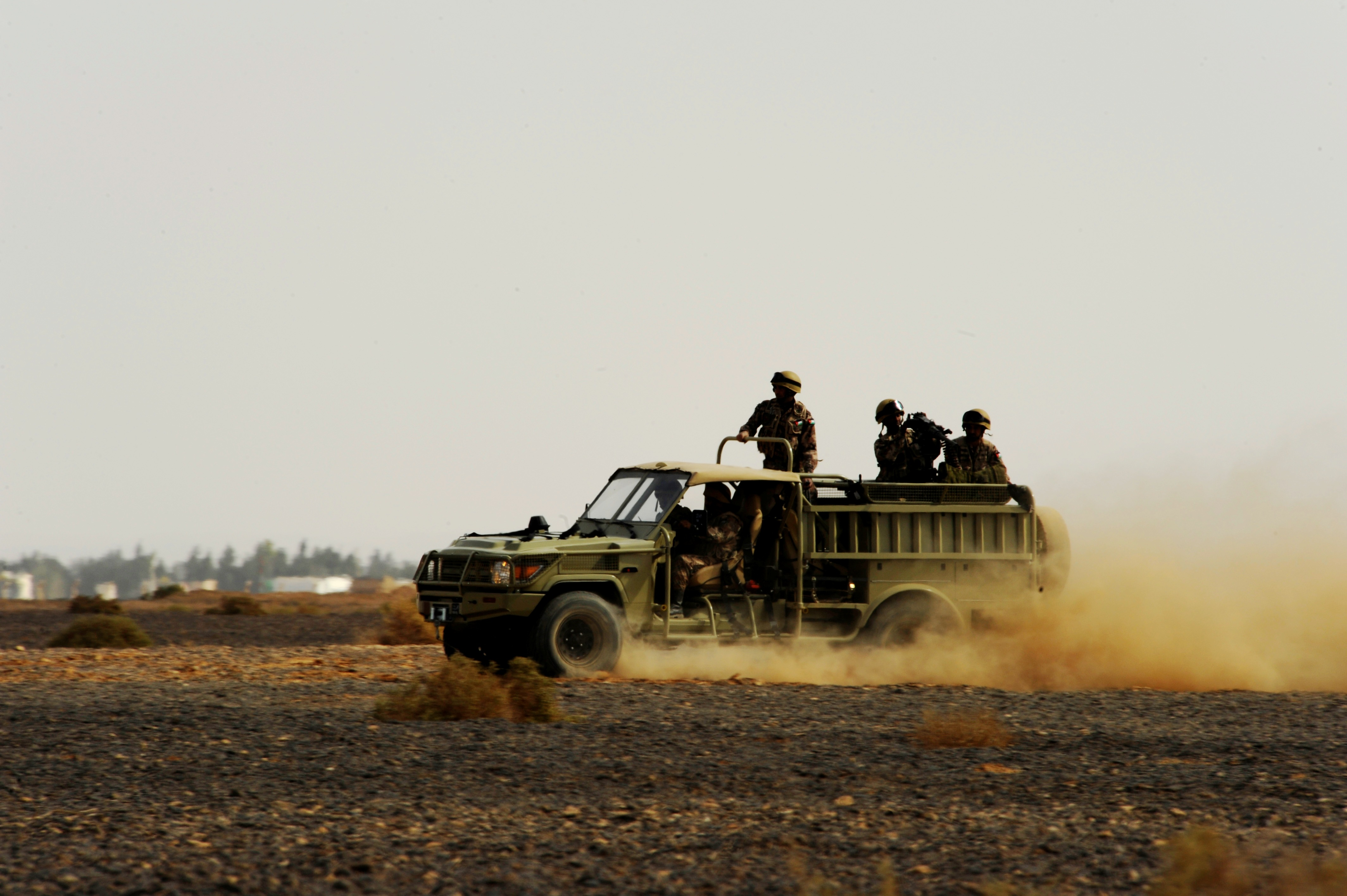
Jordanian SF driving Al-Thalab LRPV in Desert

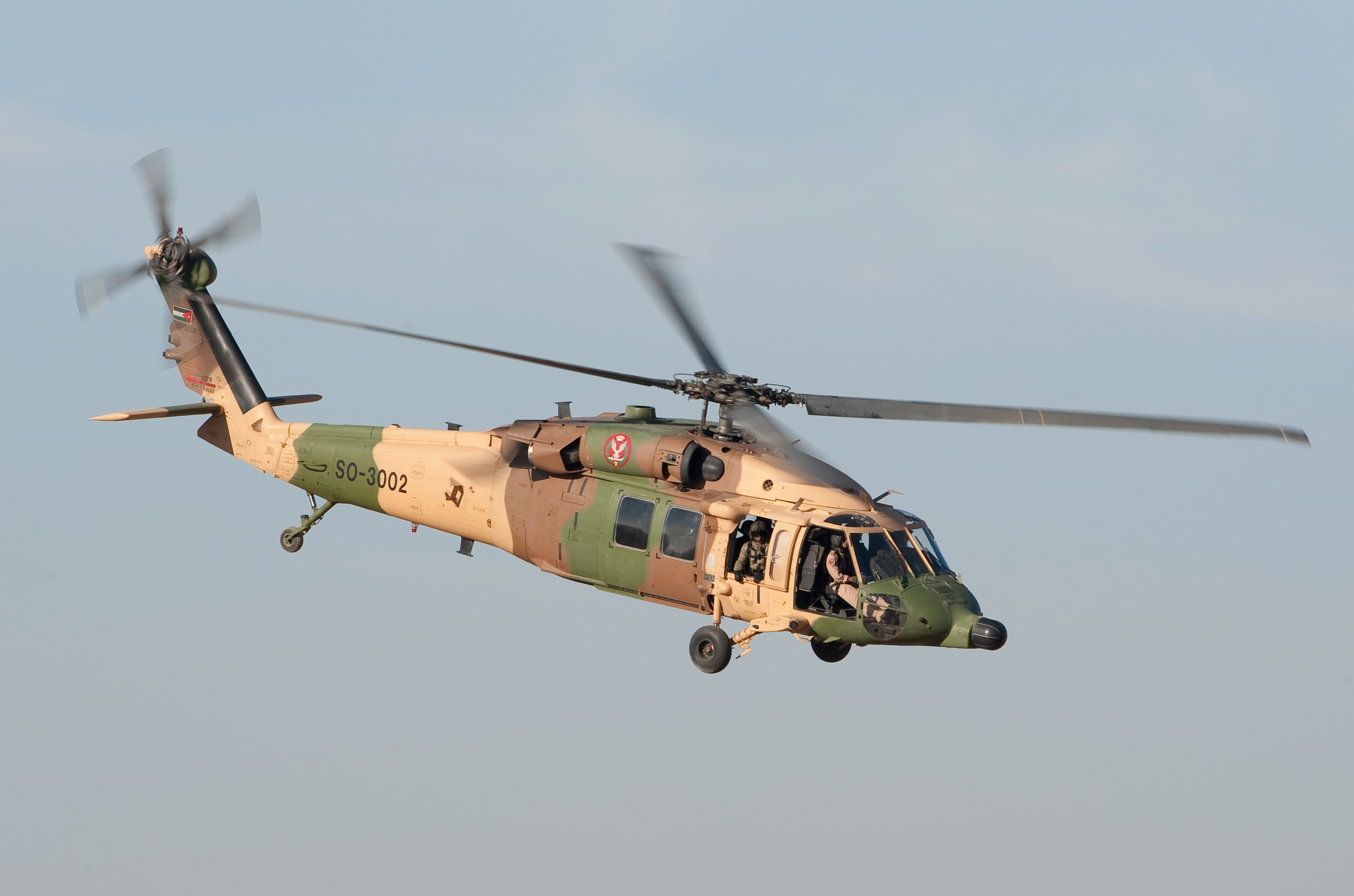
Jordanian UH-60L from 30th Special Operations Sqn.

=== Tactical ===
- Occupying airborne bridge-head to assist ground forces.
- Conducting raids on enemy headquarters, artillery sites, missile sites, roads and any other significant key targets.
- Airborne and air assault operations.
- Armor hunting.
- Strategic reconnaissance missions.
- Organizing, training and developing guerrilla forces.
- Operating behind enemy lines.
- Assaulting captive cells and freeing prisoners of war.
- Urban area operations.
- Readiness to assist any Arab brethren countries upon request.
- Search and rescue operation.

=== Security ===
- Counter terrorism operations.
- Counter infiltration and smuggling.
- Internal security operations.

=== Training ===
- Provide rangers and paratrooper training to JAF units.
- Provide officers and non-commissioned officers (NCO) from Arab countries with special operations and ranger courses.
- Train public security and customs department officers.
- Participate in training courses held in Arab countries.

=== Strategic ===
- Participate in UN missions.
- Assist in training friendly forces.
- Evacuation operations in time of disasters.

== KA II Royal Special Forces Command Structure ==
- 71_{st} Special Battalion - Counter-Terrorism
- 101_{st} Special Forces Battalion
- 51_{st} Special Support Battalion
- Special Reconnaissance & Surveillance (SRS) Battalion
- Ranger and Airborne Battalion
  - HQ Company
  - 1_{st} Ranger and Airborne Company
  - 2_{nd} Ranger and Airborne Company
  - Air Operations Company
  - General Support Company
- King Abdullah II Special Operations Training Centre
- Prince Hashem School for Special Forces

== King Abdullah II Special Operations Training Centre ==
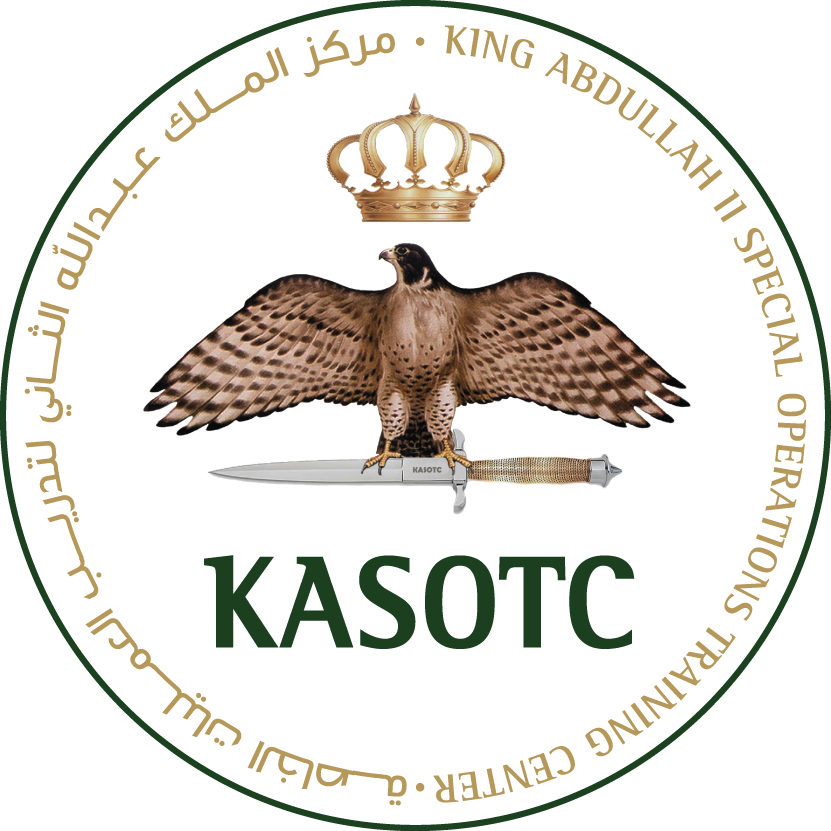
KASOTC

The King Abdullah II Special Operations Training Center is an installation located in Amman that specializes in the latest counterterrorism, special operations and irregular warfare tactics, techniques and procedures. The base was built by a U.S. construction firm on land donated by the King of Jordan and paid for by the U.S. Defense Department Foreign Military Sales programme, part of the 2005 special appropriation. Management of the construction was undertaken by the United States Army Corps of Engineers.

By 2009, the center had been made operational. The center is managed by experienced active and retired special forces personnel and qualified training staff. As a turn-key facility, the center is ideal for pre-deployment training, joint and combined military exercises, or enhancing proficiency of unit requirements. All curricula are scalable to unit size and training needs. Courses begin in the classroom, where trainees master abstract concepts and discuss creative solutions. Trainees then apply their knowledge and skill in a variety of field exercises; simulating real-world conditions including live-fire and maneuver. Performance is observed, measured, and evaluated using state-of-the-art feedback systems.

== Prince Hashem School for Special Operations ==
The Prince Hashem School for Special Operations serves to train and qualify officers and NCOs from JAF.

The school went through the following key phases in terms of organization and development

- in 1963 The first ranger and airborne course was trained by American training team and Ranger and Airborne training wing was established in infantry school.
- In 1970 Ranger and Airborne training wing was established in RSF.
- In 1979 Special forces school was formed and continued to evolve until 1983, where four were formed.
- In 1983 Four training wings (ranger, airborne, specialization and field) were established.
- In 1995 The organization was advanced with a new battalions system and free fall center was added.
- On 1 October 1996 the name has been modified and was called "Joint Special Operations School."
- On 24/12/2001 special operations school was renamed Prince Hashem bin Al Hussein School for Special Operations.
- In 2017, the school transferred from special forces to Army Training Command.

School Goals and Duties

1. The preparation and training of special operations officers on Common functions.
2. The preparation and training of joint special operations commissioned officers.
3. The preparation and training of juvenile soldiers basic training and specialist training.
4. The preparation and training of members of the armed forces through special training.
5. Training of Public security, civil defense, customs and General Intelligence personnel.
6. Training members of friendly States on rangers and paratroopers and other special forces works.
7. The training of graduates of university officers (field) in addition to the pupils and candidates from Mutah University on rangers and paratroopers.
8. Participate in the testing of new weapons and gear mechanisms and sufficiency of Joint special operations duties.
9. Conduct annual tests for units and formations Joint special operations and the armed forces.

School Courses

1. Platoon Commander's Basic Tactics Course
2. English Language Training Course For Officers/NCO
3. Ranger Course
4. Ranger and Airborne Instruction Course
5. Airborne Course
6. Air Assault Course
7. Fighting In Built Up Areas and Internal Security
8. Hand To Hand Fighting (Sejal)
9. Marksmanship and Range Management Course
10. Special Operations Selection Course (officers and other ranks)
11. Section and Group Commanders
12. Packing And Parachute Maintenance
13. Free Fall Course
14. Jump Masters Course
15. Pathfinders Course
16. Airborne Infiltration Course
17. Strategic Reconnaissance Course

== Recruiting ==
Enrollment in the Jordan armed forces is on a voluntary basis, and this is obviously also true for the special operations. The first requirement for those willing to join the special operations is that they should successfully pass physical and mental fitness tests.

From a psychological point of view, applicants are evaluated by a military psychologist in order to assess their personal and leadership traits. Then, applicants undergo a medical screening and an initial PT test. Those who make it through this preliminary selection phase are admitted to an endurance camp (boot camp) for a month of extensive training. The camp is designed to test trainees’ ability to work under physical and mental stress.

Upon completing the camp, recruits take ranger and parachute courses. After this second phase, they are sent to specialized courses to complete their military professional training.

== Training Courses ==
Training Courses Obtained By Special Operations Operator

| Course | Period | |
|---|---|---|
| Basic Ranger Course | 10 weeks | Basic Ranger Course is the basic course obtained by all Special Operations personnel, Focus on fitness and high individual skills and the ability to endure different difficulties and different areas of training. |
| Parachute Course | 4 weeks | The Parachute Course is the 2nd basic course held after the Basic Ranger Course for all Special Operations personnel. Aimed at strengthening the self-confidence of special operations soldiers and parachute jumping skills. |
| Jump Master Course | 2 weeks | Is one of the most important specialist courses for the air operations unit to sustain operations of Parachuting, air supply and how to deal with the Air Force. |
| Parachute Fold & Maintenance Course | 6 weeks | This Course is one of the most important courses in order to qualify for special air operations units on how to maintain and fold parachutes to reach the maximum degree of possible safety and security. |
| Load and Air Transport Course | 3 weeks | This course is held to train specialists in the preparation and processing of loading either individuals, vehicles and their equipment onto transport planes, helicopters, as well as transporting companies/battalions or Brigade sized units so that there is an equal distribution of responsibilities for the completion of the work required. |
| Free Jump Course | 6 weeks | The Free Jump course is one of the most important professional class courses to train Parachute Free Jumping (Tactical/Training), each trainee performs an average of 25 Free Jumps except the training jumps. |
| Parachute Landing (Pathfinder) Course | 3 weeks | This course trains participants in how to deal with winged or vertical aircraft and how to provide guidance and Air control, and also how to set up and operate drop zones, pickup zones, and helicopter landing sites for airborne operations, air resupply operations, or other air operations in support of the ground unit commander. |
| Navigation Course | 4 weeks | Training of officers and NCOs to read maps and aerial photos, navigation, installation, and also training to use encrypted maps as well as training on the use of GPS devices and other special devices. |
| Urban Warfare & Internal Security Course | 8 weeks | This course trains officers and NCOs and other ranks on the methods, skills, planning, and execution processes of defense and attack on Urban areas. As well as further training in planning and execution of tasks that contribute to the maintenance, control, and stability of Homeland Security. |
| Special Forces Course | 13 weeks | Preparation and rehabilitation officers and NCO of special forces operations in conditions of conventional and non-conventional war. This course is one of the most important professional class. |
| Tae-kwon-do Course | 24 weeks | Training of officers and NCO to free martial arts and self-defense skills and styles used in this session to develop physical abilities of participants and hone their skills to be helpful to them in the implementation of the obligations and duties of self-defense And the situations that require the imposition of a certain reality without the use of arms. As well as representation of armed forces in Taekwon-do game. |
| Brazilian jiu-jitsu Course | 24 weeks | Brazilian jiu-jitsu is a martial art, combat sport, and a self-defense system that focuses on grappling and especially ground fighting and using the combat punch, kick by the elbow, knee, head, hand and fingers in addition to clashes that rely on break or bend the joints of the body and ground fighting techniques and submission holds involving joint-locks and choke-holds. |
| Basic Skills Course | 6 weeks | Training of officers and NCO in special operations to use the terrain better use and how to utilize camouflage, fire and movement techniques, and development of individual and physical abilities and some special operations. This is one of the Basic courses for the special operations personnel |
| Sijal & control stick Course | 8 weeks | The Sijal is a Jordanian self-defense style similar to Krav Maga. The preparation and training of officers and NCO in identifying weak points in the human body or to exploit them for protection as well as training and martial arts and self-defense using body parts only or using other tools and equipment such as: (Normal and regular police stick and bayonet, knives and other edged weapons) |
| Air Insertion Course | 4 weeks | Rehabilitation officers and NCO in special operations to execute rapid intrusions of hostile targets using winged aircraft or helicopters to transport the troops to the nearest point of the goal as quickly as possible to execute the duty and pick up after execution of the operation and the protection and attribution of helicopter gunships. |
| Explosives & Adverse actions Course | 3 weeks | Training of officers and NCO on how to handle explosives and various explosive extras and how to prepare fillings and booby-traps and packages and adverse actions, and also training on how to deal with Blind bombs. |

== Uniforms ==
Special Forces Command and QRF Brigade wear MultiCam with maroon berets. Some Special Unit II teams wear Full Black Pattern.

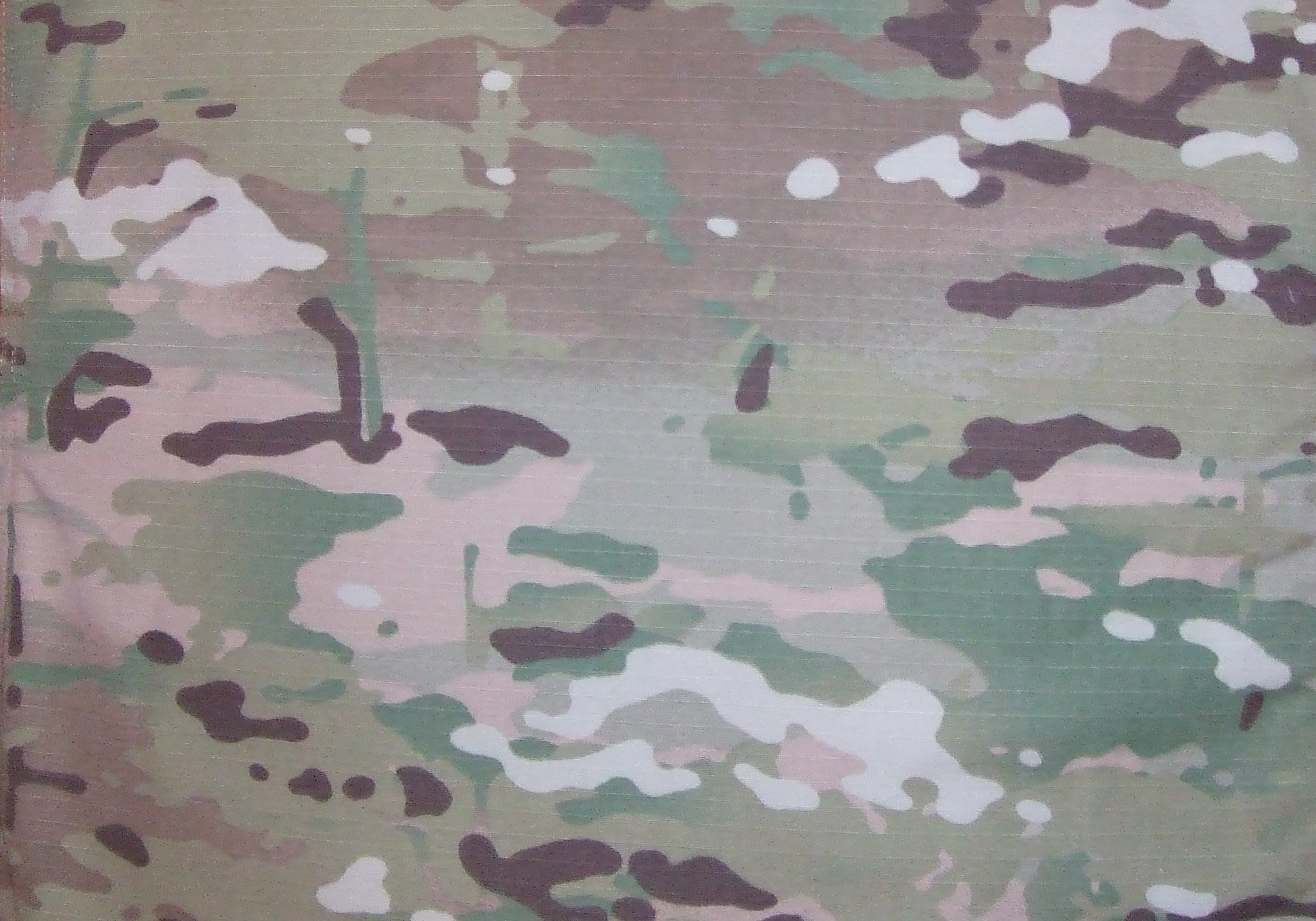
MultiCam
