= Jordanian Southern Command =

Jordanian Southern Command المنطقة العسكرية الجنوبية
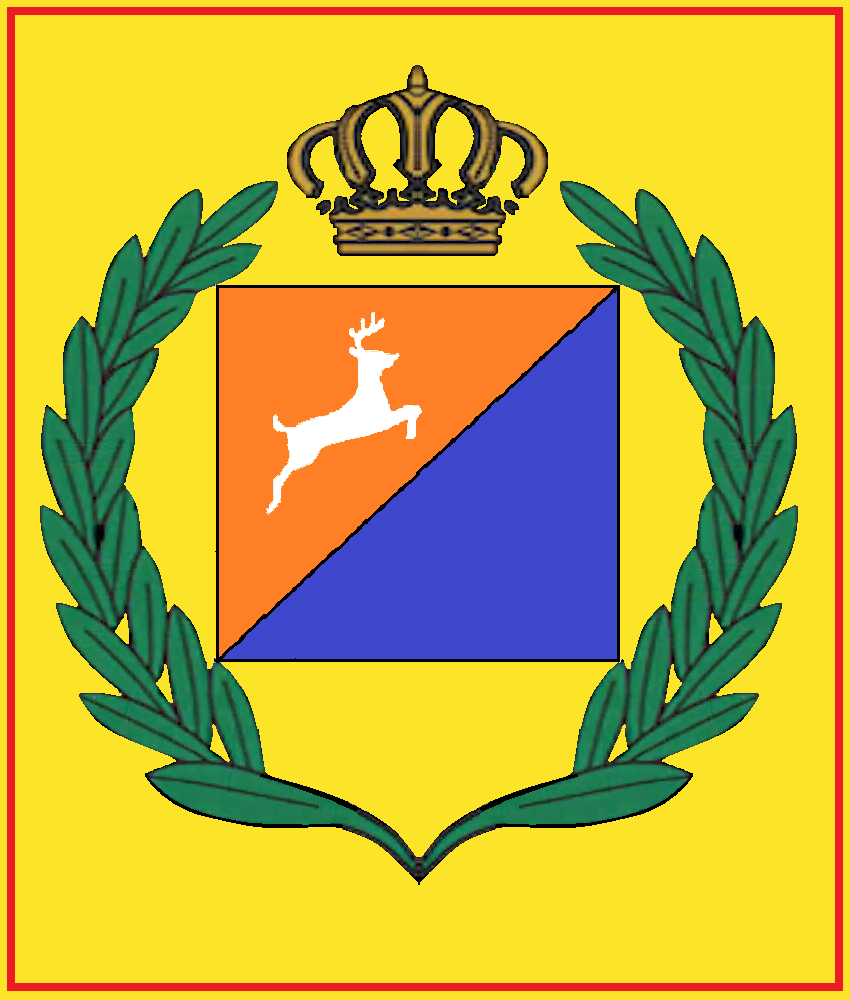
- Southern Command Shoulder sleeve insignia
- Active: 1970 - present
- Country: Jordan
- Branch: Royal Jordanian Army
- Type: Armored & Mechanized Infantry
- Role: Multi Role
- Size: 13,000 - 15,000 (2012 est.)
- Garrison/HQ: Aqaba, Ma'an, Tafilah, Al Karak
- Colors: KA2 Desert Digital
- Engagements: Six-Day War; War of Attrition; Black September

Commanders
- Current commander: Brigadier General Hilal Abdul Halim Al-Khawaldeh

The Jordanian Southern Command (Arabic:المنطقة العسكرية الجنوبية) is the Jordanian Armed Forces regional command responsible for a large area in the Kingdom and defending 4 cities (Aqaba, Ma'an, Tafilah, Al Karak).

== History ==
Jordanian Southern Command is the smallest regional command in JAF, this command defend 4 cities and consist of one Armoured brigade, one infantry brigade and other support units. In 2000 the King Abdullah II made a big step to modernize and restructure Jordanian Armed Forces when the Divisions have been transformed into a lighter, more mobile forces, based largely on a brigade structure and considered better capable of rapid reaction in emergencies.

A number of infantry battalions are normally assigned to defend Karak, located just to the east of the southern part of the Dead Sea, and Aqaba, the port city in the deep south of Jordan, near the border with Saudi Arabia. Some of the units based in the Aqaba area also have a coastal defence role.

== Organisation ==
The Southern Command controls regional units covering Aqaba, Ma'an, Tafilah & Al Karak. The head of Southern command is Brigadier General Hilal Abdul Halim Al-Khawaldeh.

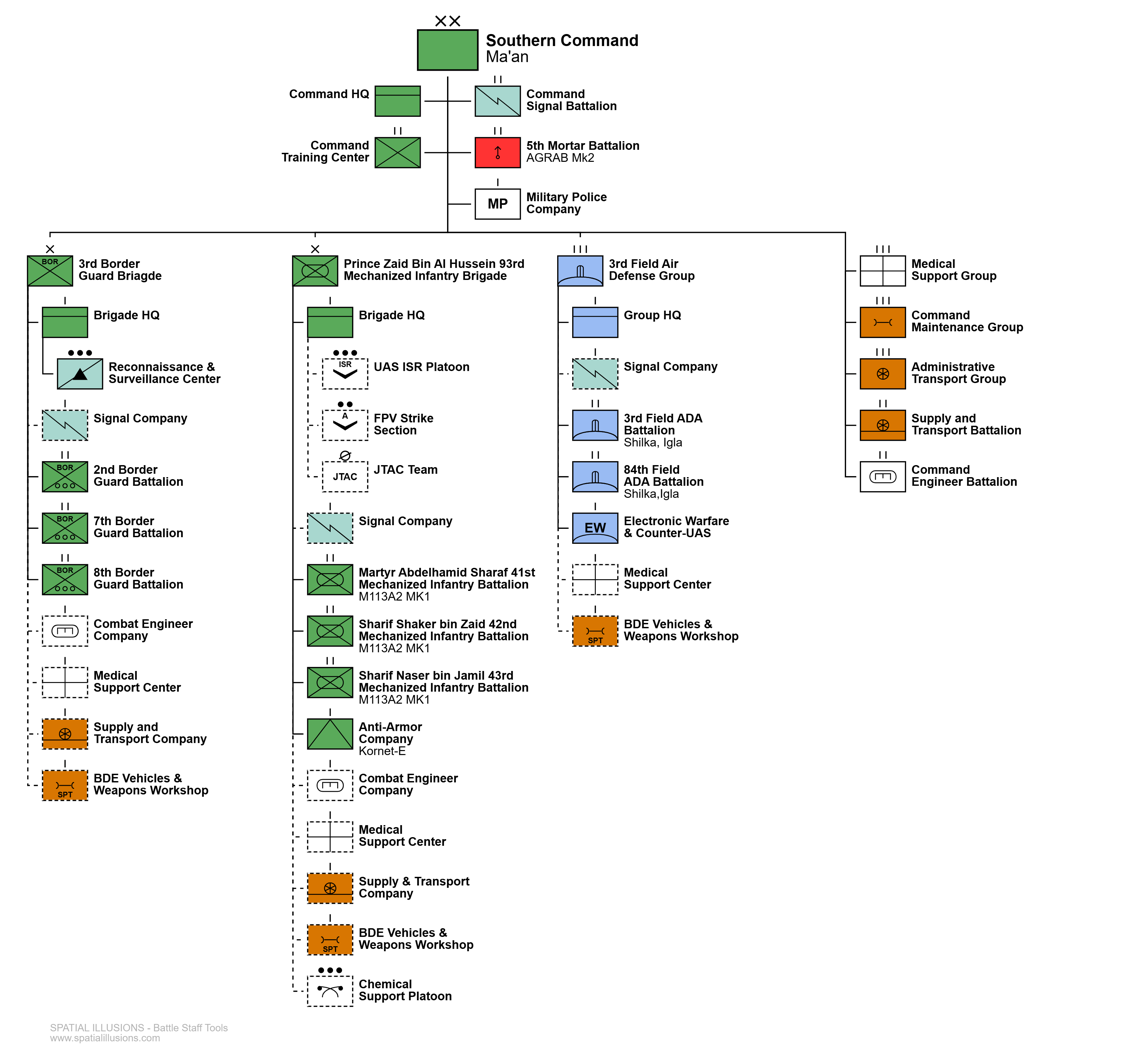
Southern Command OrBat 2026

=== Southern Command HQ ===
  - Command Staff
  - HQ Defense Company
  - Command Communication Battalion
  - Command Military Police
  - Command Training Center

==== Border Guard Formation ====
===== 3_{rd} Border Guard Force Brigade =====
  - Brigade HQ
    - Command Staff
    - Signal Company
    - Reconnaissance & Surveillance Center
  - 2_{nd} Border Guard Force Battalion
  - 7_{th} Border Guard Force Battalion
  - 8_{th} Border Guard Force Battalion
  - Combat Support (Direct Support)
    - 2_{nd} Engineer Company (DS, Command Engineer Battalion)
    - Chemical Support Platoon (DS, Chemical Support Group)
  - Combat Service Support
    - 2_{nd} Supply & Transport Company (DS, Command Supply & Transport Battalion)
    - Brigade Maintenance Company (Vehicles & Weapons Workshop)
    - Brigade Medical Company (Role 1)

==== Combat & Maneuver Units ====
===== Prince Zaid Bin Al Hussein 93_{rd} Mechanized Infantry Brigade =====
  - Brigade HQ
    - Command Staff
      - Joint Fires Coordination Cell - Targeting Cell
      - Information and PsyOps Cell
      - Intelligence Cell
    - Signal Company
    - UAS ISR Platoon
    - FPV Strike Platoon
    - JTAC Team
  - Martyr Abdelhamid Sharaf 41_{st} Mechanized Infantry Battalion (Aqaba) (M113A2 MK1)
  - Sharif Shaker bin Zaid 42_{nd} Mechanized Infantry Battalion (Al-Karak) (M113A2 MK1)
  - Sharif Naser bin Jamil 43_{rd} Mechanized Infantry Battalion (Ma'an) (M113A2 MK1)
  - Anti-Armor Company (Kornet-E)
  - Fires Support (Direct Support)
    - 84_{th} Field ADA Battalion (Shilka, Igla)
  - Combat Support (Direct Support)
    - 1_{st} Engineer Company (DS, Command Engineer Battalion)
    - Chemical Support Platoon (DS, Chemical Support Group)
  - Combat Service Support
    - 1_{st} Supply & Transport Company (DS, Command Supply & Transport Battalion)
    - Brigade Maintenance Company (Vehicles & Weapons Workshop)
    - Brigade Medical Company (Role 1)

==== Combat Support Units ====
- 3_{rd} Field Air Defense Group
  - Group HQ
    - Signal Company
  - 4_{th} Field ADA Battalion (Shilka, Strela-10, Igla) (Supports 40th Armored Brigade)
  - Electronic Warfare & Counter-UAS Unit (EW/C-UAS)
- Command Engineer Battalion
  - 2 Mechanized Engineer Companies ^{[1]}
  - General Support Company

==== Service Support Units ====
  - Supply and Transport Battalion
    - 2 Supply & Transport Companies ^{[1]}
  - Administrative Transport Group
  - Command Maintenance Group
  - Medical Support Group

Notes:

1. Each company supports a brigade

== Standard Mechanized Infantry Battalion Structure (TO&E) ==
This organizational structure reflects the standard Table of Organization and Equipment used by mechanized infantry battalions. Individual battalions may have variations depending on mission attachments or equipment.

• Battalion Headquarters
- Battalion Commander (CO)
- Battalion Executive Officer (XO)
- Command and Control Section
- Fire Support / Artillery Coordination Element
- Tech / Tactical Communications (09T)
- JTAC (09K)

• Mechanized Infantry Company (x3)
- Company HQ
  - AMB – Ambulance/Medical Team
  - ENG – Engineer Detachment
  - ART – Artillery Liaison / FSO Team
- 3 × Mechanized Platoons (each with 3 sections)

• Support / Weapons Company
- Company HQ
  - SWP – Support-weapons / specialist element
  - AMB – Ambulance/medical team
  - WIN – Additional company support element
- Sniper Squad (Tac-50 & M82A1 Barrett)
  - 4 x Sniper Teams (Teams 8A–8D)
- Anti-Tank Platoon (Javelin)
  - Section 6A (2 teams)
  - Section 6B (2 teams)
- Mortar Platoon (81 mm)
  - Section 5A (2 APC-mounted mortars)
  - Section 5B (2 APC-mounted mortars)
  - Section 5C (2 APC-mounted mortars)

• Battalion Combat Support
- Intelligence Cell (09C)
- Engineer Platoon (battalion-level) (09G)
- Artillery Liaison Element (09R)
- Electronic Warfare (EW) (09W)
- Air Defense Section (09A)
- CBRN Detachment (09N)

• Battalion Combat Service Support
- Medical Section (09H)
- Manpower and Personnel Section (09M)
- Tactical Logistics Support

== Unit Summary ==
Number	Unit Type	Equipment
3	Mechanized Infantry Battalion	YPR-765 IFV, M113A2MK1J, M577A2, YPR-806, Humvee, FMTV, Navistar 7000 series, DAF Military Trucks
3	Border Guard Battalion	MRAP, M113A2MK-1J, Humvee, FMTV, Navistar 7000 series, DAF Military Trucks
2	Field ADA Battalion	Strela-10, ZSU-23-4 Shilka, Igla-S, 9K38 Igla, DAF Military Trucks
1	Engineer Battalion	YPR-765, M113A2, Armoured Tracked Bulldozer (CAT D6T, D7G/R, D8R, D9, Komatsu D155A), Wheeled Bulldozer (CAT 924H, 966C/D/F/G/H, Komatsu WA300-1, WA320, WA380-3A, W470-3), excavators, graders (CAT 12G, 120M), dump trucks, Backhoe loaders, loaders, M58 MICLIC, Aardvark JSFU, FMTV, Navistar 7000 series, DAF Military Trucks, Combat Dozer UDK1 and Bomb disposal robots.
1	Command Communication Battalion	M577A2, M113A2, MRAP, Humvee, FMTV, Navistar 7000 series, DAF Military Trucks
1	Supply & Transport Battalion	FMTV, Navistar 7000 series, DAF Military Trucks, Fuel Tankers, Toyota Trucks and many other vehicles.
1	Medical Support Group	M577A2 Ambulance, M113A2 Ambulance, HMMWV M997 Ambulance, Toyota Land Cruiser Ambulance, Mobile Field Hospitals on trucks.
1	Maintenance Group	M113A2, M88 Recovery Vehicle, M1089 Wrecker, FMTV, Navistar 7000 series, DAF Maintenance Workshop Trucks
1	Administrative Transport Group	
