= Jordanian Northern Command =

Jordanian Northern Command المنطقة العسكرية الشمالية
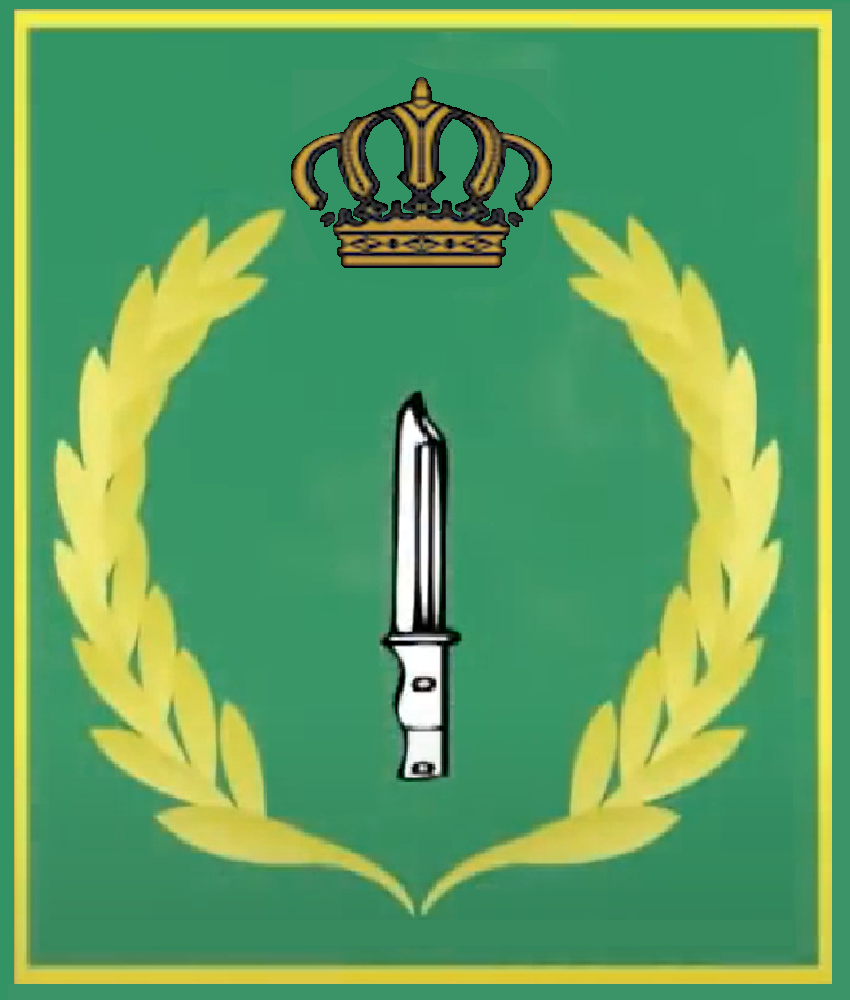
- Northern Command Shoulder sleeve insignia
- Active: 1970 – 2000 (12th Mech. Div.); 2000 – present
- Country: Jordan
- Branch: Royal Jordanian Army
- Type: Mechanized Infantry
- Role: Multi Role
- Size: 15,000 - 18,000 (2012 est.)
- Garrison/HQ: Irbid, Ajloun, Jerash
- Colors: KA2 Desert Digital
- Engagements: 1948 Arab–Israeli War; Retribution operations; Six-Day War; War of Attrition; Black September

Commanders
- Current commander: Brigadier General Khaled Al-Masaeid

The Jordanian Northern Command (Arabic:المنطقة العسكرية الشمالية) is the Jordanian Armed Forces regional command responsible for the defense of the northern front against possible attack by Syria or Israel.

== History ==
The Northern Command was formed in 1977 as part of a major reorganization of the Royal Jordanian Army. The Units that make up the command were transferred from the 12th Mechanized Division that was disbanded. Northern Command units are deployed from Ramtha through Umm Qays to the Zarqa River in a defensive posture that cover both Israel and Syria.

In 2000, King Abdullah II initiated a further re-organization and restructuring of the Jordanian Armed Forces, with the divisions being transformed into lighter, more mobile forces, based largely on a brigade structure and considered better capable of rapid reaction in emergencies.

The 12th Mechanised Division was normally deployed facing west (towards Israel) and north (towards Syria) from the Zarqa river, around Umm Qais, to Ramtha. The western part of Jordan's frontier with Syria is a deep gorge along the Yarmuk River, but there is flatter ground further to the east where an attack could take place; Jordanian forces traditionally maintained a defensive posture along this sector.

Jordanian forces have not been deployed in the Jordan Valley itself, where they would be vulnerable to Israeli air power and artillery. They were deployed on the heights above the valley in positions that enable them to obstruct any enemy movement up the routes to the central plateau leading to the main cities. There are a number of surfaced roads leading up to the top of the escarpment, about 800 to 1,200 m above the floor of the valley, but a well-entrenched force could ensure that any enemy advance up those roads could only be attempted at great cost.

This command was involved in many wars, including the 1948 Arab–Israeli War, the Six-Day War, the War of Attrition and the war against the Syrian army when it tried to enter Jordan in the Black September conflict.

== Organisation ==
The Northern Command commands regional units from Um Qais in Irbid to the Zarqa River south of Jerash, with a presence in Ar Ramtha. Brigadier General Khaled Al-Masaeid was appointed commander of the Northern Command.

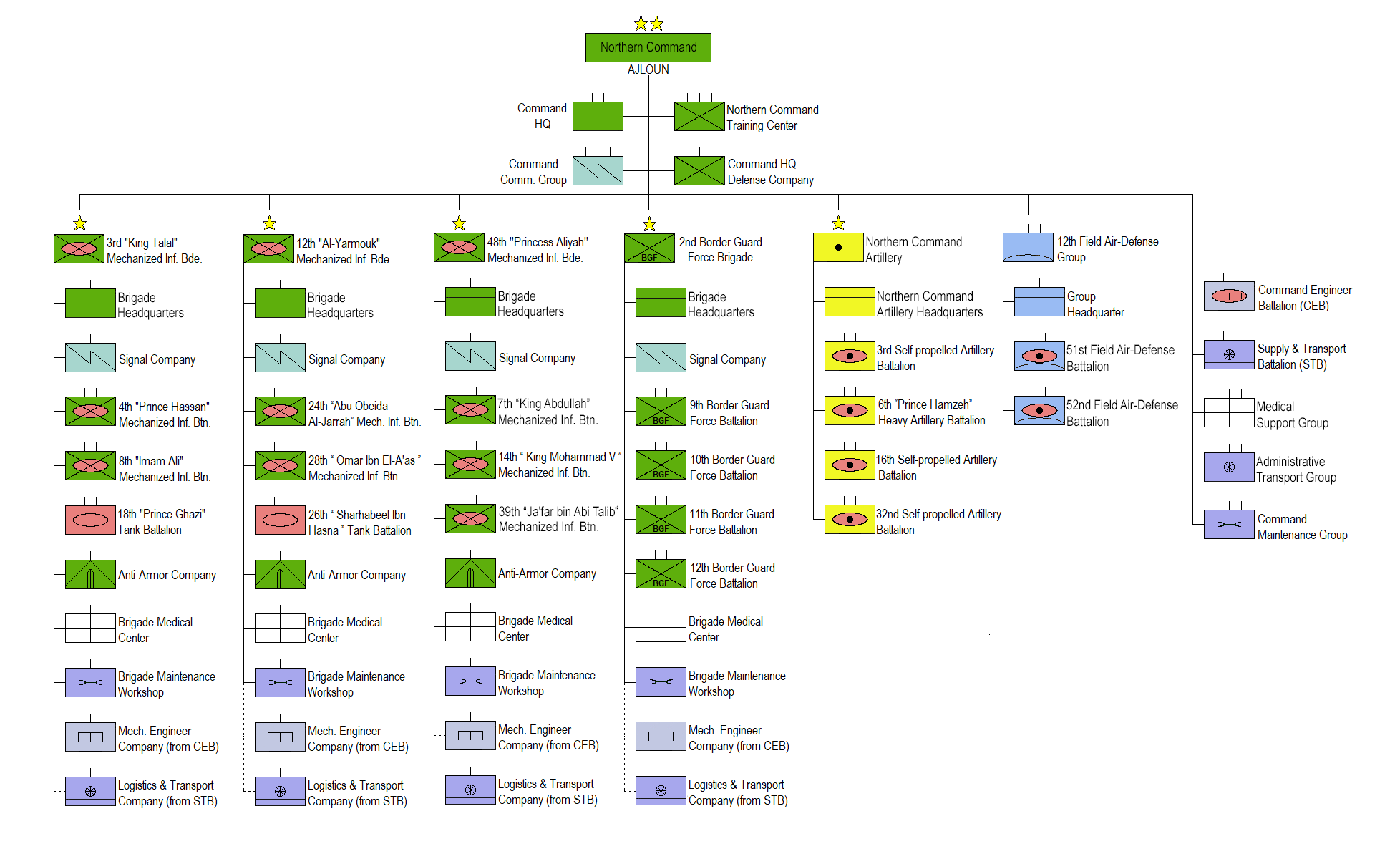
Northern Command OrBat 2020 (Click to enlarge)

=== Northern Command HQ ===
  - Command Staff
  - HQ Defense Company
  - Command Communication Group
  - Command Military Police
  - Command Training Center

==== Border Guard Formation ====
===== 2nd Border Guard Force Brigade =====
  - Brigade HQ
    - Command Staff
    - Signal Company
    - Reconnaissance & Surveillance Center
  - 9th Border Guard Force Battalion
  - 10th Border Guard Force Battalion
  - 11th Border Guard Force Battalion
  - 12th Border Guard Force Battalion
  - Combat Support (Direct Support)
    - 4th Engineer Company (DS, Command Engineer Battalion)
    - Chemical Support Platoon (DS, Chemical Support Group)
  - Combat Service Support
    - 4th Supply & Transport Company (DS, Command Supply & Transport Battalion)
    - Brigade Maintenance Company (Vehicles & Weapons Workshop)
    - Brigade Medical Company (Role 1)

==== Combat & Maneuver Units ====
===== King Talal 3rd Mechanized Infantry Brigade =====
  - Brigade HQ
    - Command Staff
      - Joint Fires Coordination Cell - Targeting Cell
      - Information and PsyOps Cell
      - Intelligence Cell
    - Signal Company
    - UAS ISR Platoon
    - FPV Strike Platoon
    - JTAC Team
  - Prince Hassan 4th Mechanized Infantry Battalion (YPR-765 pri)
  - Imam Ali 8th Mechanized Infantry Battalion (M113A2 MK1)
  - Prince Ghazi 18th Tank Battalion (M60A3)
  - Anti-Armor Company (Kornet-E)
  - Fires Support (Direct Support)
    - 16th Field Artillery Battalion (M109A3)
    - 51st Field ADA Battalion (Shilka, Strela-10, Igla)
  - Combat Support (Direct Support)
    - 1st Engineer Company (DS, Command Engineer Battalion)
    - Chemical Support Platoon (DS, Chemical Support Group)
  - Combat Service Support
    - 1st Supply & Transport Company (DS, Command Supply & Transport Battalion)
    - Brigade Maintenance Company (Vehicles & Weapons Workshop)
    - Brigade Medical Company (Role 1)

===== Al-Yarmouk 12th Mechanized Infantry Brigade =====
  - Brigade HQ
    - Command Staff
      - Joint Fires Coordination Cell - Targeting Cell
      - Information and PsyOps Cell
      - Intelligence Cell
    - Signal Company
    - UAS ISR Platoon
    - FPV Strike Platoon
    - JTAC Team
  - Abu Obeida Al-Jarrah 24th Mechanized Infantry Battalion (YPR-765 pri)
  - Sharhabeel Ibn Hasna 26th Tank Battalion (M60A3)
  - Omar Ibn El-A'as 28th Mechanized Infantry Battalion (M113A2 MK1)
  - Anti-Armor Company (M901 ITV)
  - Fires Support (Direct Support)
    - 3rd Field Artillery Battalion (M109A3)
    - 52nd Field ADA Battalion (Shilka, Strela-10, Igla) ^{[1]}
  - Combat Support (Direct Support)
    - 2nd Engineer Company (DS, Command Engineer Battalion)
    - Chemical Support Platoon (DS, Chemical Support Group)
  - Combat Service Support
    - 2nd Supply & Transport Company (DS, Command Supply & Transport Battalion)
    - Brigade Maintenance Company (Vehicles & Weapons Workshop)
    - Brigade Medical Company (Role 1)

===== Princess Aliyah 48th Mechanized Infantry Brigade =====
  - Brigade HQ
    - Command Staff
      - Joint Fires Coordination Cell - Targeting Cell
      - Information and PsyOps Cell
      - Intelligence Cell
    - Signal Company
    - UAS ISR Platoon
    - FPV Strike Platoon
    - JTAC Team
  - King Abdullah 7th Mechanized Infantry Battalion (M113A2 MK1)
  - King Mohammad V 14th Mechanized Infantry Battalion (YPR-765 pri)
  - Ja'far bin Abi Talib 39th Mechanized Infantry Battalion (M113A2 MK1)
  - Anti-Armor Company (Kornet-E)
  - Fires Support (Direct Support)
    - 32nd Field Artillery Battalion (M109A3)
    - 52nd Field ADA Battalion (Shilka, Strela-10, Igla) ^{[1]}
  - Combat Support (Direct Support)
    - 3rd Engineer Company (DS, Command Engineer Battalion)
    - Chemical Support Platoon (DS, Chemical Support Group)
  - Combat Service Support
    - 3rd Supply & Transport Company (DS, Command Supply & Transport Battalion)
    - Brigade Maintenance Company (Vehicles & Weapons Workshop)
    - Brigade Medical Company (Role 1)

==== Combat Support Units ====
- Northern Command Artillery ^{[2]}
  - Command Artillery HQ
    - Signal Company
    - STA Company
  - Prince Hamzeh 6th Heavy Artillery Battalion (M110A2)
- 12th Field Air Defense Group ^{[2]}
  - Group HQ
    - Signal Company
  - Electronic Warfare & Counter-UAS Unit (EW/C-UAS)
- Command Engineer Battalion
  - 4 Mechanized Engineer Companies ^{[3]}
  - General Support Company

==== Service Support Units ====
  - Supply and Transport Battalion
    - 4 Supply & Transport Companies ^{[3]}
  - Administrative Transport Group
  - Command Maintenance Group
  - Medical Support Group

Notes:

1. 52nd AD battalion supports two mechanized brigades
2. Subordinate battalions attached to combat brigades
3. Each company supports a brigade

== Standard Mechanized Infantry Battalion Structure (TO&E) ==
This organizational structure reflects the standard Table of Organization and Equipment used by mechanized infantry battalions. Individual battalions may have variations depending on mission attachments or equipment.

• Battalion Headquarters
- Battalion Commander (CO)
- Battalion Executive Officer (XO)
- Command and Control Section
- Fire Support / Artillery Coordination Element
- Tech / Tactical Communications (09T)
- JTAC (09K)

• Mechanized Infantry Company (x3)
- Company HQ
  - AMB – Ambulance/Medical Team
  - ENG – Engineer Detachment
  - ART – Artillery Liaison / FSO Team
- 3 × Mechanized Platoons (each with 3 sections)

• Support / Weapons Company
- Company HQ
  - SWP – Support-weapons / specialist element
  - AMB – Ambulance/medical team
  - WIN – Additional company support element
- Sniper Squad (Tac-50 & M82A1 Barrett)
  - 4 x Sniper Teams (Teams 8A–8D)
- Anti-Tank Platoon (Javelin)
  - Section 6A (2 teams)
  - Section 6B (2 teams)
- Mortar Platoon (81 mm)
  - Section 5A (2 APC-mounted mortars)
  - Section 5B (2 APC-mounted mortars)
  - Section 5C (2 APC-mounted mortars)

• Battalion Combat Support
- Intelligence Cell (09C)
- Engineer Platoon (battalion-level) (09G)
- Artillery Liaison Element (09R)
- Electronic Warfare (EW) (09W)
- Air Defense Section (09A)
- CBRN Detachment (09N)

• Battalion Combat Service Support
- Medical Section (09H)
- Manpower and Personnel Section (09M)
- Tactical Logistics Support

== Unit Summary ==
Number	Unit Type	Equipment
2	Tank Battalion	M60A3 IFCS, M577A2, M88A1 ARV, FMTV, Navistar 7000 series
7	Mechanized Infantry Battalion	YPR-765 IFV, M113A2MK1J, M577A2, YPR-806, Humvee, FMTV, Navistar 7000 series, DAF Military Trucks
4	Border Guard Battalion	MRAP, M113A2MK-1J, Humvee, FMTV, Navistar 7000 series, DAF Military Trucks
3	Self-Propelled Artillery	M109A2 Howitzer, YPR-765, M113A2, M577A2, FMTV, Navistar 7000 series, DAF Military Trucks
1	Heavy Self-Propelled Artillery	M110A2 Howitzer, YPR-765, M113A2, M577A2, FMTV, Navistar 7000 series, DAF Military Trucks
2	Field ADA Battalion	Strela-10, ZSU-23-4 Shilka, Igla-S, 9K38 Igla, DAF Military Trucks
1	Engineer Battalion	YPR-765, M113A2, Armoured Tracked Bulldozer (CAT D6T, D7G/R, D8R, D9, Komatsu D155A), Wheeled Bulldozer (CAT 924H, 966C/D/F/G/H, Komatsu WA300-1, WA320, WA380-3A, W470-3), excavators, graders (CAT 12G, 120M), dump trucks, Backhoe loaders, loaders, M58 MICLIC, Aardvark JSFU, FMTV, Navistar 7000 series, DAF Military Trucks, Combat Dozer UDK1 and Bomb disposal robots.
1	Communication Group	M577A2, M113A2, MRAP, Humvee, FMTV, Navistar 7000 series, DAF Military Trucks
1	Supply & Transport Battalion	FMTV, Navistar 7000 series, DAF Military Trucks, Fuel Tankers, Toyota Trucks and many other vehicles.
1	Medical Support Group	M577A2 Ambulance, M113A2 Ambulance, HMMWV M997 Ambulance, Toyota Land Cruiser Ambulance, Mobile Field Hospitals on trucks.
1	Maintenance Group	M113A2, M88 Recovery Vehicle, M1089 Wrecker, FMTV, Navistar 7000 series, DAF Maintenance Workshop Trucks
1	Administrative Transport Group	
