= Jordanian Central Command =

Jordanian Central Command المنطقة العسكرية الوسطى
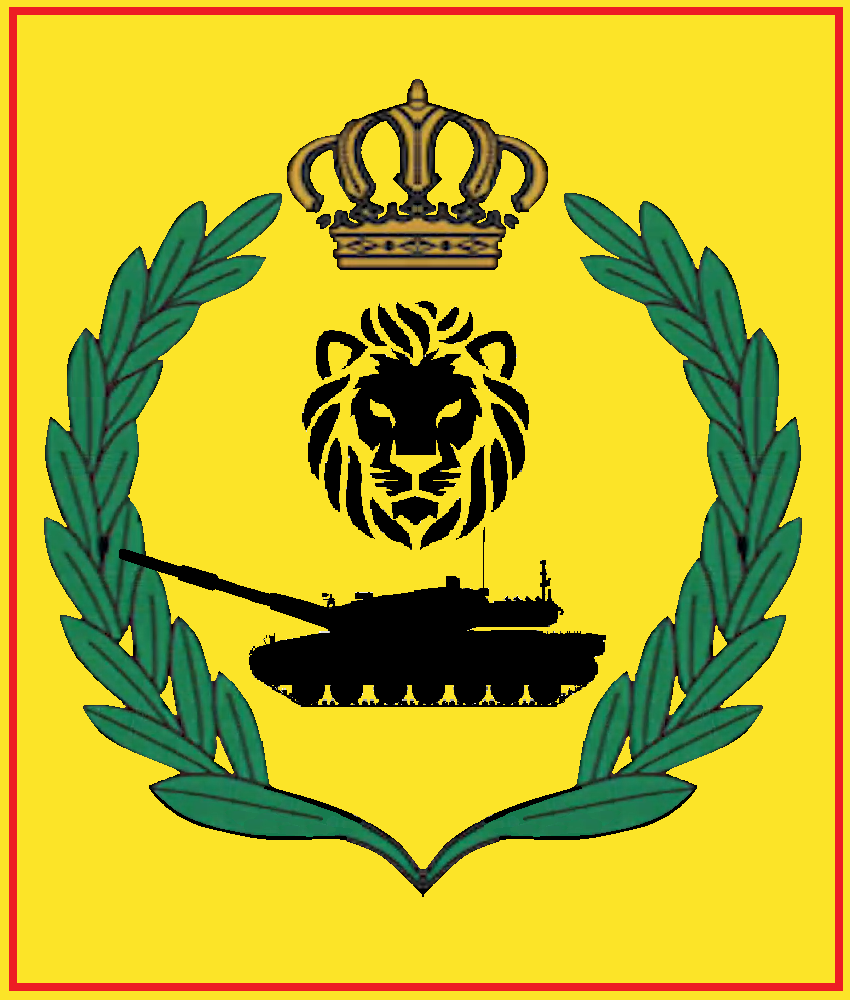
- Shoulder sleeve insignia of the Central Command
- Active: 1970–2000 (4th Mech. Div.); 2000 – present
- Country: Jordan
- Branch: Royal Jordanian Army
- Type: Mechanized Infantry
- Role: Multi Role
- Size: 13,000–15,000 (2012 est.)
- Garrison/HQ: Amman, Balqa, Madaba
- Colors: KA2 Desert Digital
- Engagements: 1948 Arab–Israeli War; Retribution operations; Six-Day War; Battle of Karameh; War of Attrition; Black September; Yom Kippur War

Commanders
- Current commander: Brigadier General Adnan Ahmed Al-Raqqad

The Jordanian Central Command (Arabic: المنطقة العسكرية الوسطى) is the regional command of the Jordanian Armed Forces tasked with overseeing the primary front against Israel.

== History ==
The Central Command was established as part of a significant army reorganization in 1977. Its units were transferred from the former 4th Mechanized Division, which was disbanded. Presently, the command's units are stationed from the Zarqa River, north of as-Salt, to the Dead Sea, safeguarding Jordan's border with Israel. In 2000, King Abdullah II initiated further restructuring of the Jordanian Armed Forces, transforming the remaining divisions into lighter, more mobile forces. These forces adopted a primarily brigade-based structure, enhancing their ability to respond rapidly to emergencies.

The former 4th Mechanised Division was positioned westward, covering the sector from the Dead Sea to the Zarqa River north of Salt. The Jordan Valley, acting as the natural boundary between the two countries along this sector, features a rugged, winding terrain. Additionally, the line of hills to the east of the valley offers a natural defensive position for Jordanian forces.

Jordanian forces have strategically avoided deploying in the Jordan Valley itself, where they could be susceptible to Israeli air power and artillery. Instead, they occupy positions on the heights above the valley, strategically positioned to impede any enemy advancement along the routes leading to the central plateau and major cities. Several surfaced roads ascend to the top of the escarpment, situated approximately 800 to 1,200 meters above the valley floor. However, a well-entrenched force could effectively deter any enemy attempt to advance along these routes, albeit at significant cost.

The Central Command has played a pivotal role in various conflicts, including the 1948 Arab–Israeli War, the Six-Day War in 1967, the Battle of Karameh, the War of Attrition, and the confrontation against the Syrian army during the Black September event.

In 2018, two armored brigades (40th and 60th) and several other units were transferred from the deactivated 3rd Armored Division to the Central Command.

== Organisation ==
The Central Command oversees regional units spanning from the Dead Sea to the Zarqa River north of Salt, Jordan. Currently, Brigadier General Adnan Ahmed Al-Raqqad serves as the head of the Central Command.

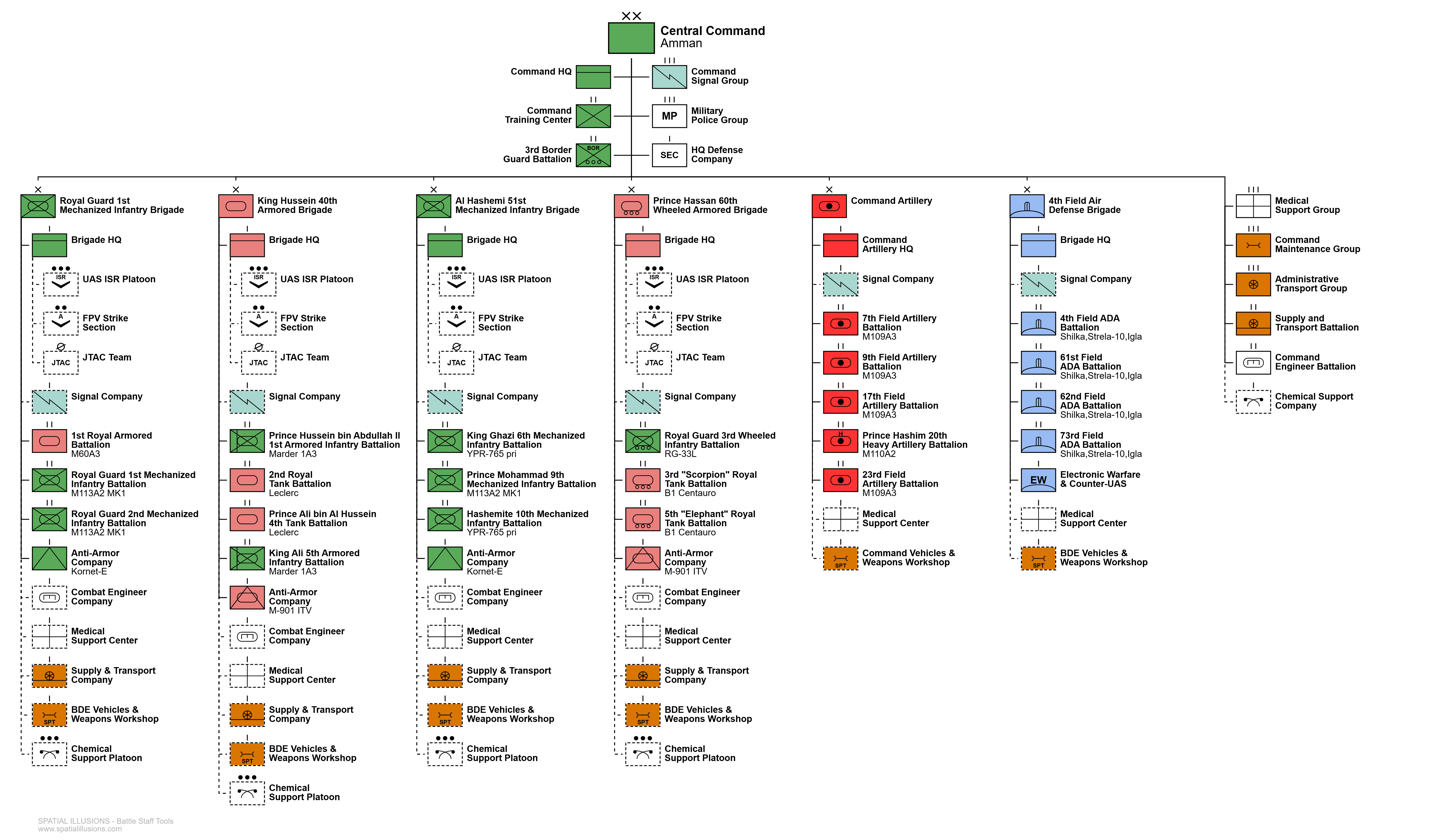
Central Command Orbat (2026)

=== Central Command HQ ===
  - Command Staff
  - HQ Defense Company
  - Command Communication Group
  - Command Military Police
  - Command Training Center

==== Border Guard Formation ====
  - Reconnaissance & Surveillance Center
  - 3_{rd} Border Guard Force Battalion

==== Combat & Maneuver Units ====
===== Royal Guard 1_{st} Mechanized Infantry Brigade =====
  - Brigade HQ
    - Command Staff
      - Joint Fires Coordination Cell - Targeting Cell
      - Information and PsyOps Cell
      - Intelligence Cell
    - Signal Company
    - UAS ISR Platoon
    - FPV Strike Section
    - JTAC Team
  - 1_{st} Royal Armored Battalion (M60A3)
  - Royal Guard 1_{st} Mechanized Infantry Battalion (M113A2 MK1)
  - Royal Guard 2_{nd} Mechanized Infantry Battalion (M113A2 MK1)
  - Anti-Armor Company (Kornet-E)
  - Fires Support (Direct Support)
    - 17_{th} Field Artillery Battalion (M109A3)
    - 62_{nd} Field ADA Battalion (Shilka, Strela-10, Igla)
  - Combat Support (Direct Support)
    - 1_{st} Engineer Company (DS, Command Engineer Battalion)
    - Chemical Support Platoon (DS, Chemical Support Group)
  - Combat Service Support
    - 1_{st} Supply & Transport Company (DS, Command Supply & Transport Battalion)
    - Brigade Maintenance Company (Vehicles & Weapons Workshop)
    - Brigade Medical Company (Role 1)

===== Al Hashemi 51_{st} Mechanized Infantry Brigade =====
  - Brigade HQ
    - Command Staff
      - Joint Fires Coordination Cell - Targeting Cell
      - Information and PsyOps Cell
      - Intelligence Cell
    - Signal Company
    - UAS ISR Platoon
    - FPV Strike Section
    - JTAC Team
  - King Ghazi 6_{th} Mechanized Infantry Battalion (YPR-765 pri)
  - Prince Mohammad 9_{th} Mechanized Infantry Battalion (M113A2 MK1)
  - Hashemite 10_{th} Mechanized Infantry Battalion (YPR-765 pri)
  - Anti-Armor Company (Kornet-E)
  - Fires Support (Direct Support)
    - 9_{th} Field Artillery Battalion (M109A3)
    - 61_{st} Field ADA Battalion (Shilka, Strela-10, Igla)
  - Combat Support (Direct Support)
    - 2_{nd} Engineer Company (DS, Command Engineer Battalion)
    - Chemical Support Platoon (DS, Chemical Support Group)
  - Combat Service Support
    - 2_{nd} Supply & Transport Company (DS, Command Supply & Transport Battalion)
    - Brigade Maintenance Company (Vehicles & Weapons Workshop)
    - Brigade Medical Company (Role 1)

===== King Hussein 40_{th} Armored Brigade "Fire Brigade" =====
  - Brigade HQ
    - Command Staff
      - Joint Fires Coordination Cell - Targeting Cell
      - Information and PsyOps Cell
      - Intelligence Cell
    - Signal Company
    - UAS ISR Platoon
    - FPV Strike Section
    - JTAC Team
  - Prince Hussein bin Abdullah II 1_{st} Armored Infantry Battalion (Marder 1A3)
  - 2_{nd} Royal Tank Battalion (Leclerc)
  - Prince Ali bin Al Hussein 4_{th} Tank Battalion (Leclerc)
  - King Ali 5_{th} Armored Infantry Battalion (Marder 1A3)
  - Anti-Armor Company (M901 ITV)
  - Fires Support (Direct Support)
    - 7_{th} Field Artillery Battalion (M109A3)
    - 4_{th} Field ADA Battalion (Shilka, Strela-10, Igla) (attached from Southern Command 3rd Field AD Group)
  - Combat Support (Direct Support)
    - 3_{rd} Engineer Company (DS, Command Engineer Battalion)
    - Chemical Support Platoon (DS, Chemical Support Group)
  - Combat Service Support
    - 3_{rd} Supply & Transport Company (DS, Command Supply & Transport Battalion)
    - Brigade Maintenance Company (Vehicles & Weapons Workshop)
    - Brigade Medical Company (Role 1)

===== Prince Hassan 60_{th} Wheeled Armored Brigade =====
  - Brigade HQ
    - Command Staff
      - Joint Fires Coordination Cell - Targeting Cell
      - Information and PsyOps Cell
      - Intelligence Cell
    - Signal Company
    - UAS ISR Platoon
    - FPV Strike Section
    - JTAC Team
  - Royal Guard 3_{rd} Wheeled Infantry Battalion (RG-33L)
  - 3_{rd} "Scorpion" Royal Tank Battalion (B1 Centauro)
  - 5_{th} "Elephant" Royal Tank Battalion (B1 Centauro)
  - Anti-Armor Company (M901 ITV)
  - Fires Support (Direct Support)
    - 23_{rd} Field Artillery Battalion (M109A3)^{[1]}
    - 73_{rd} Field ADA Battalion (Shilka, Strela-10, Igla)
  - Combat Support (Direct Support)
    - 4_{th} Engineer Company (DS, Command Engineer Battalion)
    - Chemical Support Platoon (DS, Chemical Support Group)
  - Combat Service Support
    - 4_{th} Supply & Transport Company (DS, Command Supply & Transport Battalion)
    - Brigade Maintenance Company (Vehicles & Weapons Workshop)
    - Brigade Medical Company (Role 1)

==== Combat Support Units ====
- Central Command Artillery ^{[2]}
  - Command Artillery HQ
    - Signal Company
    - STA Company
  - Prince Hashim 20_{th} Heavy Artillery Battalion (M110A2)
- 4_{th} Field Air Defense Brigade ^{[2]}
  - Brigade HQ
    - Signal Company
  - Electronic Warfare & Counter-UAS Unit (EW/C-UAS)
- Command Engineer Battalion
  - 4 Mechanized Engineer Companies ^{[3]}
  - General Support Company

==== Service Support Units ====
  - Supply and Transport Battalion
    - 4 Supply & Transport Companies ^{[3]}
  - Administrative Transport Group
  - Command Maintenance Group
  - Medical Support Group

Notes:

1. M109A3 will be replaced by truck-mounted artillery.
2. Subordinate battalions are attached to combat brigades.
3. Each company supports a brigade.

== Standard Mechanized Infantry Battalion Structure (TO&E) ==
This organizational structure reflects the standard Table of Organization and Equipment used by mechanized infantry battalions. Individual battalions may have variations depending on mission attachments or equipment.

• Battalion Headquarters
- Battalion Commander (CO)
- Battalion Executive Officer (XO)
- Command and Control Section
- Fire Support / Artillery Coordination Element
- Tech / Tactical Communications (09T)
- JTAC (09K)

• Mechanized Infantry Company (x3)
- Company HQ
  - AMB – Ambulance/Medical Team
  - ENG – Engineer Detachment
  - ART – Artillery Liaison / FSO Team
- 3 × Mechanized Platoons (each with 3 sections)

• Support / Weapons Company
- Company HQ
  - SWP – Support-weapons / specialist element
  - AMB – Ambulance/medical team
  - WIN – Additional company support element
- Sniper Squad (Tac-50 & M82A1 Barrett)
  - 4 x Sniper Teams (Teams 8A–8D)
- Anti-Tank Platoon (Javelin)
  - Section 6A (2 teams)
  - Section 6B (2 teams)
- Mortar Platoon (81 mm)
  - Section 5A (2 APC-mounted mortars)
  - Section 5B (2 APC-mounted mortars)
  - Section 5C (2 APC-mounted mortars)

• Battalion Combat Support
- Intelligence Cell (09C)
- Engineer Platoon (battalion-level) (09G)
- Artillery Liaison Element (09R)
- Electronic Warfare (EW) (09W)
- Air Defense Section (09A)
- CBRN Detachment (09N)

• Battalion Combat Service Support
- Medical Section (09H)
- Manpower and Personnel Section (09M)
- Tactical Logistics Support

== Unit Summary ==
Number	Unit Type	Equipment
5	Tank Battalion	Leclerc, M60A3 IFCS, B1 Centauro, M88A1 ARV, M577A2, FMTV, Navistar 7000 series, DAF Military Trucks
5	Mechanized Infantry Battalion	YPR 765 IFV, M113A2MK1J, M577A2, YPR-806, Humvee, FMTV, Navistar 7000 series, DAF Military Trucks
1	Mechanized Infantry Battalion (MRAP)	RG33L MRAP, Humvee, FMTV, Navistar 7000 series, DAF Military Trucks
2	Armored Infantry Battalion (IFV)	Marder 1A3, M577A2, Humvee, FMTV, Navistar 7000 series
1	Border Guard Battalion	MRAP, Humvee, FMTV, Navistar 7000 series, DAF Military Trucks
4	Self-Propelled Artillery	M109A2 Howitzer, M113A2, M577A2, FMTV, Navistar 7000 series, DAF Military Trucks
1	Heavy Self-Propelled Artillery	M110A2 Howitzer, M113A2, M577A2, FMTV, Navistar 7000 series, DAF Military Trucks
3	Field ADA Battalion	Strela-10, ZSU-23-4 Shilka, Igla-S, 9K38 Igla, Navistar 7000 series, DAF Military Trucks
1	Engineer Battalion	YPR-765, M113A2, Armoured Tracked Bulldozer (CAT D6T, D7G/R, D8R, D9, Komatsu D155A), Wheeled Bulldozer (CAT 924H, 966C/D/F/G/H, Komatsu WA300-1, WA320, WA380-3A, W470-3), excavators, graders (CAT 12G, 120M), dump trucks, Backhoe loaders, loaders, M58 MICLIC, Aardvark JSFU, FMTV, Navistar 7000 series, DAF Military Trucks, Combat Dozer UDK1 and Bomb disposal robots.
1	Command Communication Group	M577A2, M113A2, MRAP, Humvee, FMTV, Navistar 7000 series, DAF Military Trucks
1	Supply & Transport Battalion	FMTV, Navistar 7000 series, DAF Military Trucks, Fuel Tankers, Toyota Trucks and many other vehicles.
1	Medical Support Group	M577A2 Ambulance, M113A2 Ambulance, HMMWV M997 Ambulance, Toyota Land Cruiser Ambulance, Mobile Field Hospitals on trucks.
1	Maintenance Group	M113A2, M88 Recovery Vehicle, M1089 Wrecker, FMTV, Navistar 7000 series, DAF Maintenance Workshop Trucks
1	Administrative Transport Group	
