= List of equipment of the Afghan National Army =

This page shows a list of military weapons and vehicles used by the former Afghan National Army (ANA) up until December 2016.

== Infantry weapons and equipment ==
=== Handguns and submachine guns ===
Model	Image	Origin	Type	Quantity	Notes
Beretta M9		Italy	Semi-automatic pistol		Provided by the United States Armed Forces.
Makarov		Soviet Union	Semi-automatic pistol		Inherited from the Soviet–Afghan War and Afghan Civil War.
TT		Soviet Union	Semi-automatic pistol		Inherited from the Soviet-Afghan War and Afghan Civil War.
Stechkin		Soviet Union	Machine pistol		Inherited from the Soviet-Afghan War and Afghan Civil War.
FB PM-63		Polish People's Republic	Submachine gun		

=== Assault and ceremonial rifles ===
Model	Image	Origin	Type	Quantity	Notes
M16A2 rifle		United States	Assault rifle	104,000	The United States military provided the ANA with M16 rifles as part of a modernization effort.
M4 carbine		United States	Carbine	10,000	Only used by Afghan National Army Commandos and Special Forces. M4s sold as part of a 2006 Foreign Military Sales package. Additional M4s sold as a 2008 Foreign Military Sales package.
FB Beryl		Poland	Assault rifle		Used by regular units.
Colt Canada C7		Canada	Assault rifle	2,500	On 23 December 2007, Canadian media reported that the Canadian Forces would supply the Afghan National Army with 2,500 surplus Colt Canada C7 rifles (a Canadian variant of the M16), along with training and ammunition in order to Westernise Afghan equipment. In June 2011, the Afghan National Army returned the loaned C7 rifles as the ANA preferred the American M16 rifle.
AK-47		Soviet Union	Assault rifle		Phased out of the service since 2008. Used by Afghan Special Forces and some regular units.
AKM		Soviet Union	Assault rifle		In storage.
AK-74		Soviet Union	Assault rifle		In storage.
Type 56		People's Republic of China	Assault rifle		In storage.
Zastava M70		Yugoslavia	Assault rifle		In storage.
ASh78		People's Socialist Republic of Albania	Assault rifle	30,000	In storage.

=== Sniper rifles ===
Model	Image	Origin	Type	Quantity	Notes
DPMS Panther LRT-SASS		United States	Designated marksman rifle		
Dragunov sniper rifle		Soviet Union	Designated marksman rifle		Inherited from the Soviet-Afghan War and Afghan Civil War.
PSL		Romania	Designated marksman rifle		
M24 Sniper Weapon System		United States	Sniper rifle		Provided by the United States.
Mosin–Nagant		Russian Empire; Soviet Union	Bolt-action rifle		Reserved for ceremonial use only.

=== Machine guns ===
Model	Image	Type	Origin	Quantity	Notes
M249 SAW		Light machine gun	United States; Belgium		Provided by the United States.
RPK		Light machine gun	Soviet Union		Inherited from the Soviet-Afghan War.
SG-43 Goryunov		Medium machine gun	Soviet Union		Inherited from the Soviet-Afghan War.
M240		General-purpose machine gun	United States; Belgium		Provided by the United States.
FN MAG		General-purpose machine gun	Belgium		
PK machine gun		General-purpose machine gun	Soviet Union		Inherited from the Soviet-Afghan War.
RPD		Light machine gun	Soviet Union		Inherited from the Soviet-Afghan War and Afghan Civil War.
M2 Browning		Heavy machine gun	United States		Provided by the United States.
M134 Minigun		Rotary medium machine gun	United States		Provided by the United States.
DShK		12.7x99mm heavy machine gun	Soviet Union		Inherited from the Soviet-Afghan War.
KPV heavy machine gun		14.5x114mm heavy machine gun	Soviet Union		Inherited from the Soviet-Afghan War.

=== Grenade-based weapons ===
Model	Image	Origin	Type	Number	Details
GP-25		Soviet Union	Underbarrel grenade launcher		Inherited from the Soviet-Afghan War and Afghan Civil War.
AGS-17		Soviet Union	Automatic grenade launcher		Inherited from the Soviet-Afghan War and Afghan Civil War.
M203		United States	Underbarrel grenade launcher		Foreign Military Sales package

=== Rocket-based weapons ===
Model	Image	Origin	Type	Number	Details
RPG-7		Soviet Union	Rocket-propelled grenade launcher		
RPG-16		Soviet Union	Rocket-propelled grenade launcher		
RPG-18		Soviet Union	Disposable rocket-propelled grenade launcher		
SPG-9		Soviet Union	73mm recoilless rifle		
B-10		Soviet Union	82mm recoilless rifle		
9K111 Fagot (AT-4 Spigot)		Soviet Union	Anti-tank guided missile	100	
9K32 Strela-2 (SA-7 Grail)		Soviet Union	Man-portable air-defense system		
9K34 Strela-3 (SA-14 Gremlin)		Soviet Union	Man-portable air-defense system		
RPO-A Shmel		Soviet Union	Disposable rocket-assisted flamethrower		

== Armoured vehicles ==
Model	Image	Origin	Type	Number
Humvee		United States	Military light utility vehicle	6000
M1117		United States	Internal security vehicle	400
International MaxxPro		United States	MRAP	155

Model	Image	Origin	Type	Caliber (mm)	Number
Mortars
82-BM-37		Soviet Union	Infantry mortar	82mm	1,000+
ZU-23-2		Soviet Union	Anti-aircraft gun	23mm	Unknown

== Unarmoured vehicles ==
Vehicle	Photo	Origin	Type
Navistar 7000		United States	Military truck
Ford Ranger		United States	Technical/Pickup truck

== Other vehicles ==
- International 7000-MV
- Tata Motors SK1613/SE1615/SE1615TC 4½ ton trucks (50+)
- Mercedes-Benz Actros
- Volvo FMX
- 2½ ton trucks
- Family of Medium Tactical Vehicles
- Ambulances
  - various platforms including Humvee, Unimog, Ford Ranger and other pickups
- Other Technicals of various origins:
  - Ford Ranger LTV pickups
  - Toyota Hilux
- BTS-4 Armoured Recovery Vehicle
- Bridge Laying Vehicles:
  - MTU-20
  - MTU-72
- BTM-3 Mine Clearing Vehicle
- ScanEagle unmanned aerial vehicle

== See also ==
- List of equipment of the Armed Forces of the Democratic Republic of Afghanistan
