= 3rd Armored Division (Jordan) =

King Abdullah II 3rd Armored Division
- فرقة الملك عبدالله الثاني المدرعة 3 الملكية
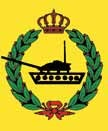
- 3rd Royal Armored Division insignia
- Active: 1969–2018 (Deactivated)
- Country: Jordan
- Branch: Jordanian Armed Forces
- Type: Division
- Role: Conventional warfare, peacekeeping
- Size: ~ 15,000 (2012 est.)
- Garrison/HQ: Amman, Al-Muwaqqar
- Colors: KA2 Desert Digital
- Engagements: 1948 Arab–Israeli War; Retribution operations; Six-Day War; Battle of Karameh; War of Attrition; Black September; Yom Kippur War

Commanders
- Current commander: Brigadier General Jumah T. Alhrout

The King Abdullah II 3rd Armored Division (Arabic:3 فرقة الملك عبدالله الثاني المدرعة) is a former armored division in Jordanian Armed Forces, active from 1969 to 2018.

== History ==
The Division was equipped and trained for high-intensity combat against highly organized enemies as well as peacekeeping missions.

The Division functioned as the Jordanian strategic reserve and was deployed between Zarqa, to the northeast of Amman, to Qatraneh in the south on near Saudi Arabia.

Since Qatraneh has a strategic position vis-a-vis the attack routes along the Dead Sea, the 40th Armored Brigade was usually based there.

In the Yom Kippur War, the 40th Armoured Brigade was sent to the Syrian front and played a significant role in the fighting.

King Abdullah II became Battalion Commander of the Second Royal Armored Battalion – 40th Armored Brigade in January 1992. In 1993, he was in the 40th Armored Brigade with the rank of Colonel.

This Division was involved in the 1948 Arab–Israeli War, reprisal operations, the Six-Day War, the Battle of Karameh, the War of Attrition, Black September and the Yom Kippur War.

In 2018, the 3rd Armored Division HQ with many support units and one armored brigade (91st) has been deactivated, the remaining two armored brigades (40th, 60th) and some units merged with Jordanian Central Command.

== Organisation ==
The Division is deployed between Zarqa, to the northeast of Amman to Qatraneh in the south on the way to Saudi Arabia.

=== Units ===
- Division Command HQ – (Deactivated in 2018)
- 3rd Royal Communication Group – (merged with Central Command Communication Group in 2018)
- Field Reconnaissance Battalion (Army Knights) – (Transferred to Directorate of Joint Military Operations)
- King Hussein 40th Armored Brigade – (Transferred to Central Command in 2018)
  - Brigade HQ
  - Signal Company
  - Prince Hussein bin Abdullah II 1st Armored Infantry Battalion (IFV)
  - 2nd Royal Tank Battalion
  - Prince Ali bin Al Hussein 4th Tank Battalion
  - Services Companies
  - Medical Company
  - Brigade Maintenance Workshop
- Prince Hassan 60th Armored Brigade – (Transferred to Central Command in 2018)
  - Brigade HQ
  - Signal Company
  - Royal Guard 3rd Armored Infantry Battalion (IFV)
  - 3rd Royal Tank Battalion
  - 5th Royal Tank Battalion
  - Services Companies
  - Medical Company
  - Brigade Maintenance Workshop
- 91st Royal Armored Brigade – (Deactivated in 2018)
  - Brigade HQ
  - Signal Company
  - King Ali 5th Armored Infantry Battalion (IFV) - (Transferred to Central Command in 2018)
  - 10th Royal Tank Battalion
  - 11th Royal Tank Battalion
  - Services Companies
  - Medical Company
  - Brigade Maintenance Workshop
- Division Artillery – (Merged with Central command in 2018)
  - Division Artillery HQ
  - 2nd SP Artillery Battalion
  - 7th SP Artillery Battalion
  - 23rd SP Artillery Battalion
  - 24th Heavy Artillery Battalion (Deactivated in 2018)
- 3rd Royal Field AD Group – (Merged with Central Command in 2018)
  - Group HQ
  - Signal Company
  - 4th Field AD Battalion (Transferred to Southern Command in 2018)
  - 73rd Field AD Battalion
- Division Engineer Battalion (Merged with Central command in 2018)
- Supply & Transport Battalion (Merged with Central command in 2018)
- Administrative Transport Group – (Deactivated in 2018)
- Medical Support Group – (Merged with Central command in 2018)
- Construction Group – (Deactivated in 2018)
- Maintenance Group – (Merged with Central command in 2018)
- Division Training Center – (Deactivated in 2018)

=== Unit summary ===
Number	Unit Type	Equipment
6	Tank Battalion	Al-Hussein, M577A2, M106A2
3	Armored Infantry Battalion	AIFV, M113A2MK1J, M577A2, YPR-765 prat, M106A2,
3	Self-Propelled Artillery	M110A2 Howitzer, M109A3L Howitzer, M113A2, M577A2, M901 ITV, M35, DAF Military trucks
2	Field ADA Battalion	9K33 Osa, Strela-10, PTRL, M163 Vulcan, ZSU-23-4 Shilka, Igla-S, 9K38 Igla, Strela-3
1	Engineer Battalion	M113A2, M35, CEV, Armored tracked bulldozer (CAT D6T, D7G/R, D8R, D9, Komatsu D155A), Wheeled bulldozer (CAT 924H, 966H), excavators, graders (CAT 12G, 120M), dump trucks, Backhoe loaders, loaders, M58 MICLIC, Aardvark JSFU, Combat Dozer UDK1 and Bomb disposal robots.
1	Command & Control & Communication Group	M577A2, M113A2, Humvee, RG-12
1	Supply & Transport Battalion	FMTV, M35, M800 & M900 Trucks, DAF Military trucks, fuel tankers, Toyota trucks and many other vehicles.
1	Medical Support Group	M113A2 Ambulance, HMMWV M997 Ambulance, Toyota Land Cruiser Ambulance, Mobile Field Hospitals on trucks.
1	Maintenance Group	M113A2, M88 Recovery Vehicle, M578 Light Recovery Vehicle, AL Monjed ARV, Chieftain ARV, YPR-806, M109 Van, M35 Trucks, M800 & M900 Trucks.
1	Construction Group	Wheeled bulldozer, M35, excavators, dump trucks, Backhoe loaders, loaders.
1	Administrative Transport Group	
