= Jordanian Eastern Command =

Jordanian Eastern Command المنطقة العسكرية الشرقية
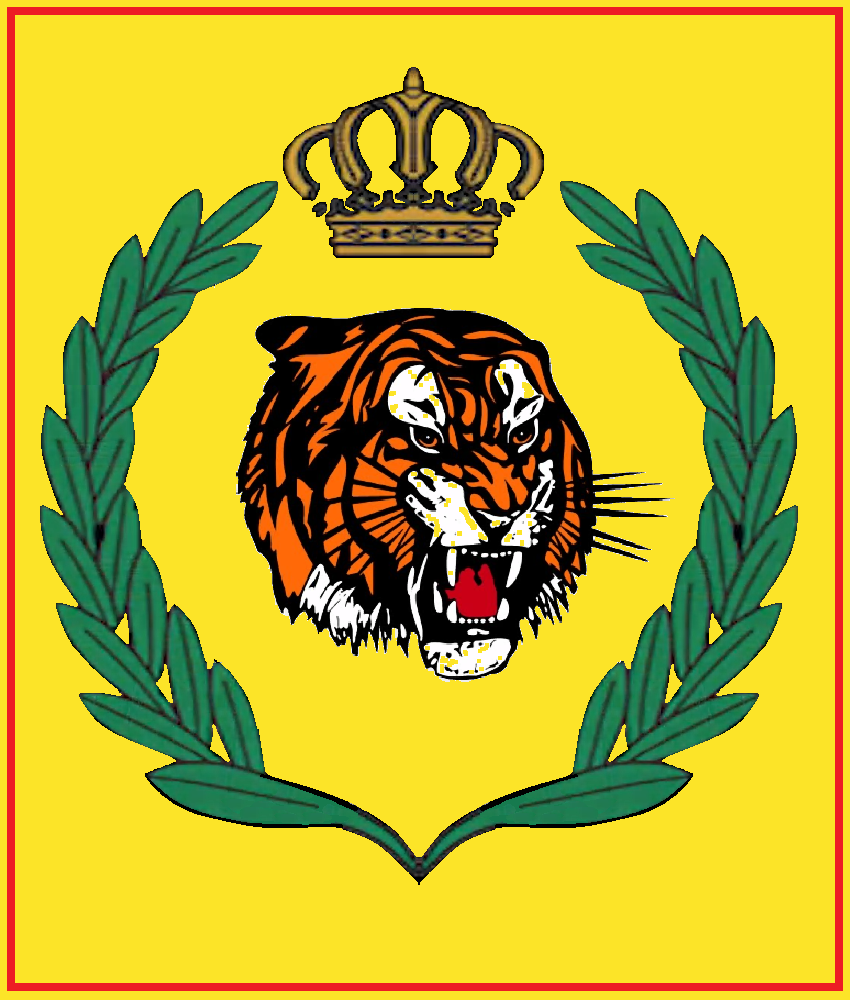
- Eastern Command Shoulder sleeve insignia
- Active: 1970 – 2000 (5th Armd. Div.); 2000 – present
- Country: Jordan
- Branch: Royal Jordanian Army
- Type: Mechanized Infantry
- Role: Multi Role
- Size: 13,000 - 15,000 (2012 est.)
- Garrison/HQ: Mafraq, Ruwaished, Zarqa
- Colors: KA2 Desert Digital
- Engagements: Six-Day War; War of Attrition; Black September

Commanders
- Current commander: Brigadier General Mohammed Suleiman Bani Yasin

The Jordanian Eastern Command (Arabic:المنطقة العسكرية الشرقية) is the Jordanian Armed Forces regional command responsible for the North - East front against Syria and Iraq.

== History ==
Since major restructuring in 1977, the Royal Jordanian Army has kept the Eastern Command (formerly known as 5th Armoured Division) deployed between the Iraqi border and Ar Ramtha on the Syrian border with some presence in Zarqa. But in 2000, King Abdullah II made a big step to modernize and restructure Jordanian Armed Forces when the Divisions have been transformed into a lighter, more mobile forces, based largely on a brigade structure and considered better capable of rapid reaction in emergencies.

Jordanian forces traditionally maintained a defensive posture along this sector. A number of major roads link Jordan and Syria in this region, crossing undulating terrain with no natural obstacles. The important air base at Mafraq are less than 20 km from the border with Syria and are therefore vulnerable to surprise attack or artillery bombardment. As a result, Jordanian forces traditionally paid particular attention to their defenses in this region. The Sector from Ramtha to the Iraqi border was covered by the Eastern Command (5th Armoured Division).

This command was involved in many conflicts and engagements, including the Six-Day War, the War of Attrition (and its Battle of Karameh) and war against the Syrian army during Black September.

== Organisation ==
The Eastern Command controls regional units from Ar Ramtha and Mafraq to the Iraqi border with some units based in Zarqa. The Head of Eastern command is Brigadier General Mohammed Suleiman Bani Yasin.

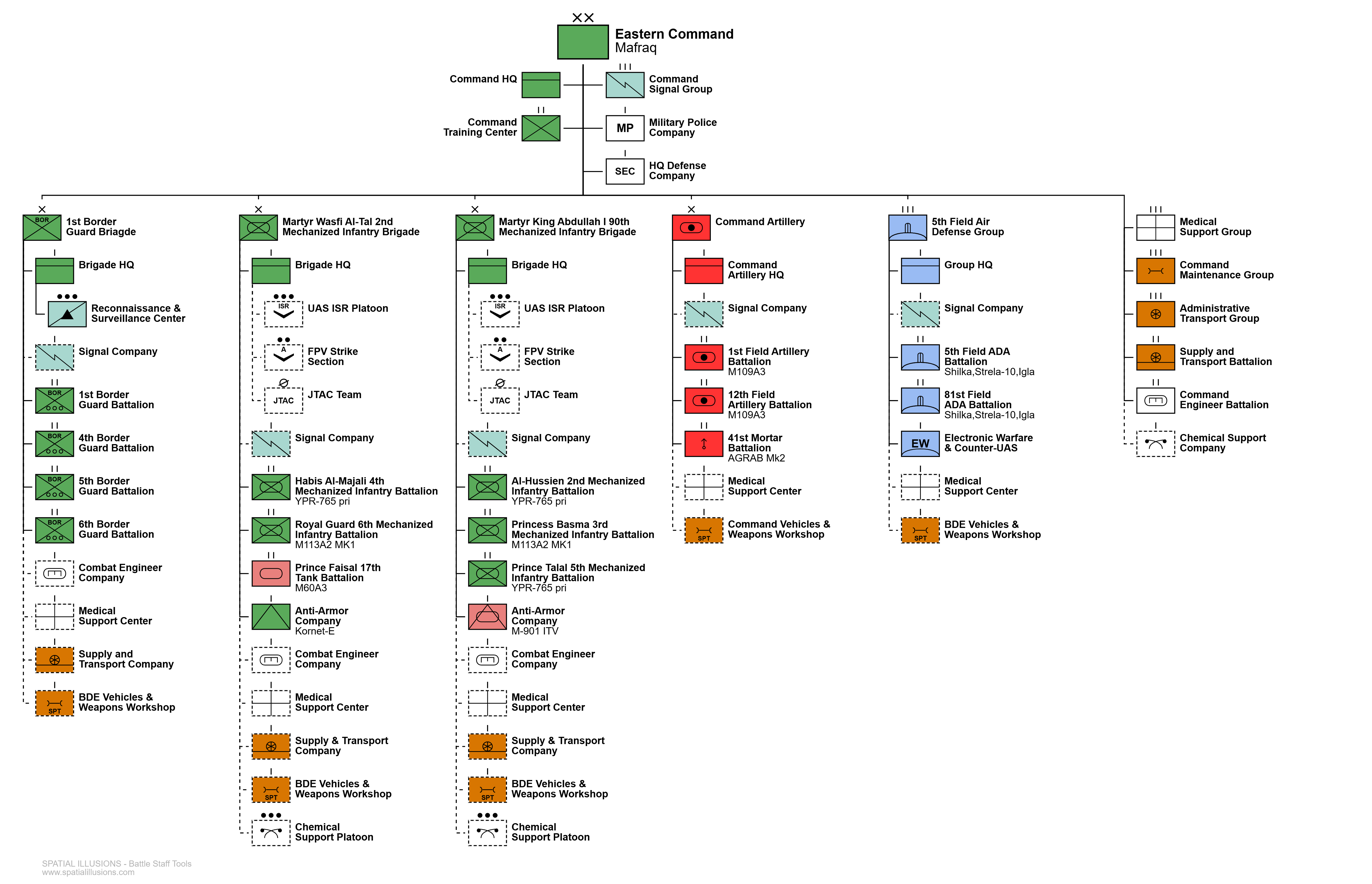
Eastern Command OrBat 2026

=== Eastern Command HQ ===
  - Command Staff
  - HQ Defense Company
  - Command Communication Group
  - Command Military Police
  - Command Training Center

==== Border Guard Formation ====
===== 1_{st} Border Guard Force Brigade =====
  - Brigade HQ
    - Command Staff
    - Signal Company
    - Reconnaissance & Surveillance Center
  - 1_{st} Border Guard Force Battalion
  - 4_{th} Border Guard Force Battalion
  - 5_{th} Border Guard Force Battalion
  - 6_{th} Border Guard Force Battalion
  - Combat Support (Direct Support)
    - 3_{rd} Engineer Company (DS, Command Engineer Battalion)
    - Chemical Support Platoon (DS, Chemical Support Group)
  - Combat Service Support
    - 3_{rd} Supply & Transport Company (DS, Command Supply & Transport Battalion)
    - Brigade Maintenance Company (Vehicles & Weapons Workshop)
    - Brigade Medical Company (Role 1)

==== Combat & Maneuver Units ====
===== Martyr Wasfi Al-Tal 2_{nd} Mechanized Infantry Brigade =====
  - Brigade HQ
    - Command Staff
      - Joint Fires Coordination Cell - Targeting Cell
      - Information and PsyOps Cell
      - Intelligence Cell
    - Signal Company
    - UAS ISR Platoon
    - FPV Strike Platoon
    - JTAC Team
  - Habis Al-Majali 4_{th} Mechanized Infantry Battalion (YPR-765 pri)
  - Royal Guard 6_{th} Mechanized Infantry Battalion (M113A2 MK1)
  - Prince Faisal 17_{th} Tank Battalion (M60A3)
  - Anti-Armor Company (Kornet-E)
  - Fires Support (Direct Support)
    - 1_{st} Field Artillery Battalion (M109A3)
    - 81_{st} Field ADA Battalion (Shilka, Strela-10, Igla)
  - Combat Support (Direct Support)
    - 1_{st} Engineer Company (DS, Command Engineer Battalion)
    - Chemical Support Platoon (DS, Chemical Support Group)
  - Combat Service Support
    - 1_{st} Supply & Transport Company (DS, Command Supply & Transport Battalion)
    - Brigade Maintenance Company (Vehicles & Weapons Workshop)
    - Brigade Medical Company (Role 1)

===== Martyr King Abdullah I 90_{th} Mechanized Infantry Brigade =====
  - Brigade HQ
    - Command Staff
      - Joint Fires Coordination Cell - Targeting Cell
      - Information and PsyOps Cell
      - Intelligence Cell
    - Signal Company
    - UAS ISR Platoon
    - FPV Strike Platoon
    - JTAC Team
  - Al-Hussien 2_{nd} Mechanized Infantry Battalion (YPR-765 pri)
  - Princess Basma 3_{rd} Mechanized Infantry Battalion (M113A2 MK1)
  - Prince Talal 5_{th} Mechanized Infantry Battalion (YPR-765 pri)
  - Anti-Armor Company (M901 ITV)
  - Fires Support (Direct Support)
    - 12_{th} Field Artillery Battalion (M109A3)
    - 5_{th} Field ADA Battalion (Shilka, Strela-10, Igla)
  - Combat Support (Direct Support)
    - 2_{nd} Engineer Company (DS, Command Engineer Battalion)
    - Chemical Support Platoon (DS, Chemical Support Group)
  - Combat Service Support
    - 2_{nd} Supply & Transport Company (DS, Command Supply & Transport Battalion)
    - Brigade Maintenance Company (Vehicles & Weapons Workshop)
    - Brigade Medical Company (Role 1)

==== Combat Support Units ====
- Eastern Command Artillery ^{[1]}
  - Command Artillery HQ
    - Signal Company
    - STA Company
  - 42_{st} Mortar Battalion (AGRAB Mk2)
- 5_{th} Field Air Defense Group ^{[1]}
  - Group HQ
    - Signal Company
  - Electronic Warfare & Counter-UAS Unit (EW/C-UAS)
- Command Engineer Battalion
  - 3 Mechanized Engineer Companies ^{[2]}
  - General Support Company

==== Service Support Units ====
  - Supply and Transport Battalion
    - 3 Supply & Transport Companies ^{[2]}
  - Administrative Transport Group
  - Command Maintenance Group
  - Medical Support Group

Notes:

1. Subordinate battalions attached to combat brigades
2. Each company supports a brigade

== Standard Mechanized Infantry Battalion Structure (TO&E) ==
This organizational structure reflects the standard Table of Organization and Equipment used by mechanized infantry battalions. Individual battalions may have variations depending on mission attachments or equipment.

• Battalion Headquarters
- Battalion Commander (CO)
- Battalion Executive Officer (XO)
- Command and Control Section
- Fire Support / Artillery Coordination Element
- Tech / Tactical Communications (09T)
- JTAC (09K)

• Mechanized Infantry Company (x3)
- Company HQ
  - AMB – Ambulance/Medical Team
  - ENG – Engineer Detachment
  - ART – Artillery Liaison / FSO Team
- 3 × Mechanized Platoons (each with 3 sections)

• Support / Weapons Company
- Company HQ
  - SWP – Support-weapons / specialist element
  - AMB – Ambulance/medical team
  - WIN – Additional company support element
- Sniper Squad (Tac-50 & M82A1 Barrett)
  - 4 x Sniper Teams (Teams 8A–8D)
- Anti-Tank Platoon (Javelin)
  - Section 6A (2 teams)
  - Section 6B (2 teams)
- Mortar Platoon (81 mm)
  - Section 5A (2 APC-mounted mortars)
  - Section 5B (2 APC-mounted mortars)
  - Section 5C (2 APC-mounted mortars)

• Battalion Combat Support
- Intelligence Cell (09C)
- Engineer Platoon (battalion-level) (09G)
- Artillery Liaison Element (09R)
- Electronic Warfare (EW) (09W)
- Air Defense Section (09A)
- CBRN Detachment (09N)

• Battalion Combat Service Support
- Medical Section (09H)
- Manpower and Personnel Section (09M)
- Tactical Logistics Support

== Unit summary ==
Number	Unit Type	Equipment
1	Tank Battalion	M60A3 IFCS, M577A2, M88A1 ARV, FMTV, Navistar 7000 series
5	Mechanized Infantry Battalion	YPR-765 IFV, M113A2MK1J, M577A2, YPR-806, Humvee, FMTV, Navistar 7000 series, DAF Military Trucks
4	Border Guard Battalion	MRAP, M113A2MK-1J, Humvee, FMTV, Navistar 7000 series, DAF Military Trucks
2	Self-propelled artillery	M109A2 Howitzer, M113A2, M577
1	Mobile Mortar Battalion	RG-31 Agrab Mk2 Mortar, Humvee, FMTV, DAF Military Trucks
2	Field ADA Battalion	Strela-10, ZSU-23-4 Shilka, Igla-S, 9K38 Igla, DAF Military Trucks
1	Engineer Battalion	YPR-765, M113A2, Armoured Tracked Bulldozer (CAT D6T, D7G/R, D8R, D9, Komatsu D155A), Wheeled Bulldozer (CAT 924H, 966C/D/F/G/H, Komatsu WA300-1, WA320, WA380-3A, W470-3), excavators, graders (CAT 12G, 120M), dump trucks, Backhoe loaders, loaders, M58 MICLIC, Aardvark JSFU, FMTV, Navistar 7000 series, DAF Military Trucks, Combat Dozer UDK1 and Bomb disposal robots.
1	Command Communication Group	M577A2, M113A2, MRAP, Humvee, FMTV, Navistar 7000 series, DAF Military Trucks
1	Supply & Transport Battalion	FMTV, Navistar 7000 series, DAF Military Trucks, Fuel Tankers, Toyota Trucks and many other vehicles.
1	Medical Support Group	M577A2 Ambulance, M113A2 Ambulance, HMMWV M997 Ambulance, Toyota Land Cruiser Ambulance, Mobile Field Hospitals on trucks.
1	Maintenance Group	M113A2, M88 Recovery Vehicle, M1089 Wrecker, FMTV, Navistar 7000 series, DAF Maintenance Workshop Trucks
1	Administrative Transport Group	
