= Eastern Command =

Eastern Command may refer to:

- Eastern Command (Australia)
- Eastern Command (India), Indian Army
- Eastern Naval Command, Indian Navy
- Eastern Command (Pakistan)
- Eastern Command (United Kingdom)
- Eastern Command of the Imperial Army (Japan)
- Jordanian Eastern Command

== See also ==
- Eastern Air Command (disambiguation)
- Eastern Naval Command (India)
- Eastern Flying Training Command (United States)
- Eastern Defense Command (United States)
- Eastern Military Command (Brazil)
