= Al-Muwaqqar =

Al-Muwaqqar الموقر
- District
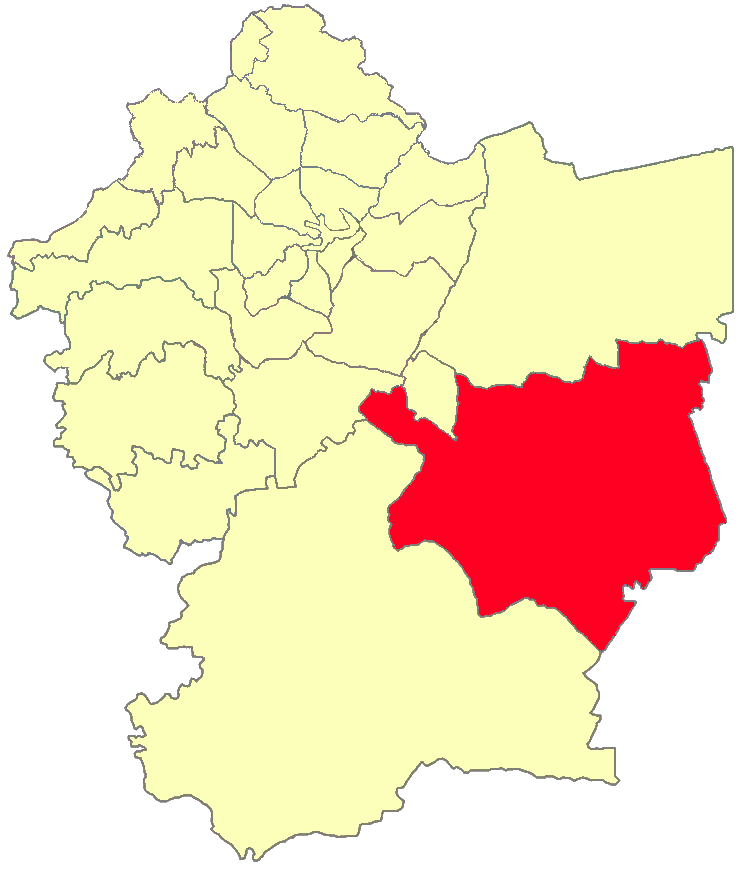
- Location of district in Amman
- Interactive map of Al-Muwaqqar
- Coordinates: 31°48′56″N 36°5′39″E
- Country: Jordan
- Governorate: Amman Governorate
- Time zone: UTC + 2

Al-Muwaqqar (Arabic: الموقر) is a district in the Amman Governorate of north-western Jordan. The village contains the scant ruins of an Umayyad palace, the Qasr al-Muwaqqar, one of the desert castles. Little remains of the palace today except several acanthus leaf capitals and gauge of a water reservoir.

The district is the headquarters of the 3rd Armored Division and a police training center. Most of the families which are staying in the region are from Bani Sakhr, like Al-Khraisha, Al-Arabid, Al-Jbour, Al-Qudahh.

Al-Muwaqqar joined the UNESCO Global Network of Learning Cities in 2019.

== Archaeology: Qasr al-Muwaqqar ==
The village contains the ruins of an Umayyad complex, the Qasr al-Muwaqqar, a qasr-type fortified palace also known as a desert castle. Almost nothing remains of the palace today except several acanthus-leaf capitals and a water level gauge for a palace cistern, inscribed with Kufic signs which indicate a maximum level of over thirty feet (c. 10 metres), very impressive for the arid climate of the area.

== Two distinct qusur, Muwaqqar and Mushash ==
Despite some name confusion, which combined the two names into one, the following are two distinct Umayyad sites which contain qusur (plural of qasr): al-Muwaqqar and Qasr al-Mushash. They lay 19.4 km apart on the historical caravan route between Amman and Azraq via Qusayr 'Amra, on which all these localities acted as way stations.

== See also ==
- Desert castles
- Islamic art
- Islamic architecture
- Jordanian art
- List of castles in Jordan
