= List of equipment of the Armed Forces of the Democratic Republic of Afghanistan =

This is a list of equipment used by the Armed Forces of the Democratic Republic of Afghanistan.

== Infantry weapons ==
Name	Image	Origin	Type	Information
Assault rifle and battle rifle
AK-74		Soviet Union	Assault rifle	
AK-47		Soviet Union	Assault rifle	
AKM		Soviet Union	Assault rifle	
AKMS		Soviet Union	Assault rifle	
SKS		USSR	Semi-automatic rifle	
Mosin-Nagant		USSR	Bolt-action rifle	First supplied to Afghanistan on Lenin's orders in 1919
Submachine gun
Heckler & Koch MP5SD		West Germany	Submachine gun	Unknown number ordered from West Germany prior to the Saur Revolution. Used by Hafizullah Amin's security detail in Storm-333.
PPSh-41		Soviet Union	Submachine gun	Phased out by 1980, were handed out to government militias.
Sniper rifle
SVD		USSR	Designated marksman rifle	Used during the Battle of Jalalabad
Machine guns
SG-43		USSR	Medium machine gun	
DShK		USSR	Heavy machine gun	
KPV heavy machine gun		Soviet Union	Heavy machine gun	
Degtyaryov machine gun		Soviet Union	Light machine gun	DTM variant used.
RP-46		Soviet Union	Light machine gun	
RPD		USSR	Light machine gun	
RPK		USSR	Light machine gun	
PK		Soviet Union	General-purpose machine gun	PKM and PKS variant used.
ZB-26		Czechoslovakia	General-purpose machine gun	
Grenade launcher
GP-25		Soviet Union	Grenade launcher	
AGS-17		USSR	Automatic Grenade Launcher	
Pistol
Makarov PM		Soviet Union	Semi-automatic pistol	Used by officers.
Tokarev TT-33		Soviet Union	Semi-automatic pistol	Handed out to government militias.
Walther P38		Nazi Germany	Semi-automatic pistol	
Stechkin		Soviet Union	Machine pistol	

== Anti-tank ==
Name	Photo	Type	Origin	Caliber	Quantity	Notes
RPG-7		Rocket-propelled grenade	Soviet Union	40mm		
RPG-16		Rocket-propelled grenade	Soviet Union	58mm		
B-10 recoilless rifle		Recoilless rifle	Soviet Union	82mm		
SPG-9		Recoilless gun	Soviet Union	73mm		

== Anti-Tank Missile ==
Name	Photo	Type	Origin	Caliber	Quantity	Notes
3M6 Shmel		Anti-tank missile	Soviet Union	136mm		
9M14 Malyutka		Anti-tank missile	Soviet Union	125mm		Some mounted on Mi-24s and BMP-1s.
9M17 Fleyta		Anti-tank missile	Soviet Union	148mm		Mounted on Mi-24A helicopters.
9K111 Fagot		Anti-tank missile	Soviet Union	120mm		Mounted on BMP-2s.

== Surface-to-air missile ==
Name	Photo	Type	Origin	Caliber	Quantity	Notes
9K32 Strela-2		Man-portable air-defense system	Soviet Union	72mm		
9K34 Strela-3		Man-portable air-defense system	Soviet Union	72mm	100	Possibly included with supplied Mi-24 gunships.
S-75 Dvina		Fixed SAM launcher	Soviet Union	700mm	18 launchers	3 battalions operated by the Air Force.
S-125 Neva		Fixed SAM launcher	Soviet Union	375mm	12 launchers	3 battalions with quad launchers operated by the Air Force.
9K35 Strela-10		Mobile SAM launcher	Soviet Union	120mm	16+ launchers	Operated by the Army

== Uniform ==
Name	Image	Origin	Type	Information
Military uniform
SSh-68		Soviet Union	Combat helmet	Main service helmet
Stahlhelm		German Empire; Austria-Hungary	Combat helmet	Austro-Hungarian M1918 helmets purchased from Czechoslovakia in the 1930s, and occasionally worn during parades.
TTsKO		Soviet Union	Combat uniform	Initially issued to officers and special units, entered mainstream adoption in the late 80s and early 90s.
KLMK		Soviet Union	Combat uniform	Issued to commando paratroopers, officers and KHAD operatives
Flak jacket		Soviet Union	Ballistic vest	provided by the KGB to Afghan units tasked with rescuing Adolph Dubs. 6b2 and ZHZL-74 body armor used by Sarandoy special purpose units.
Ushanka		Soviet Union	Fur cap	Usually worn with insignias by the Armed Forces of the Democratic Republic of Afghanistan

== Armored fighting vehicles ==
Name	Image	Origin	Type	Number
Tanks
T-34		Soviet Union	Medium tank	175+
T-54/T-55		Soviet Union	Main battle tank	1000+
T-62		Soviet Union	Main battle tank	500+
PT-76		Soviet Union	Light tank	60
Armoured fighting vehicles
BTR-152		Soviet Union	Armoured personnel carrier	Unknown
BTR-50		Soviet Union	Armoured personnel carrier	Unknown
BTR-60		Soviet Union	Armoured personnel carrier	200+
BTR-70		Soviet Union	Armoured personnel carrier	Unknown
BTR-80		Soviet Union	Armoured personnel carrier	250+
MT-LB		Soviet Union	Armoured fighting vehicle	Unknown
BRDM-2		Soviet Union	Scout car	1000+
BMP-1		Soviet Union	Infantry fighting vehicle	129+
BMP-2		Soviet Union	Infantry fighting vehicle	100+

== Unarmored vehicles ==
Name	Image	Origin	Type	Number
GAZ-66		Soviet Union	Medium truck	Unknown
GAZ-69		Soviet Union	Light utility vehicle	Unknown
UAZ-469		Soviet Union	Light utility vehicle	Unknown
Ural-375		Soviet Union	Medium truck	Several thousand.
ZIL-157		Soviet Union	Medium truck	Unknown
ZIL-131		Soviet Union	Medium truck	Unknown
KAMAZ		Soviet Union	Medium truck	Unknown

== Artillery ==
Name	Image	Origin	Type	Number
Mortar
M1938		Soviet Union	Mortar	2000+
PM-43		Soviet Union	Mortar	2000+
Self-propelled howitzer
2S1 Gvozdika		Soviet Union	Self-propelled howitzer	No more than 15
Towed artillery
122 mm howitzer 2A18 (D-30)		Soviet Union	Howitzer	400+
152 mm gun-howitzer D-20		Soviet Union	Howitzer	Unknown
122 mm howitzer M1938 (M-30)		Soviet Union	Howitzer	Unknown
130 mm towed field gun M1954 (M-46)		Soviet Union	Field gun	Unknown
152 mm howitzer-gun M1937 (ML-20)		Soviet Union	Howitzer	Unknown
Multiple rocket launcher
BM-21 Grad		Soviet Union	Self-propelled multiple rocket launcher	Unknown number in services
BM-27 Uragan		Soviet Union	Multiple rocket launcher	Unknown number in services
BM-14		Soviet Union	Multiple rocket launcher	Unknown number in services
Type 63 multiple rocket launcher		China	Multiple rocket launcher	Unknown number captured from Mujahadeen
BM-13		Soviet Union	Self-propelled multiple rocket launcher	50 BM-13-16s in 1989.
Tactical ballistic missiles
RT-17 Scud (Scud-B and Scud-C variants)		Soviet Union	Tactical ballistic missile	43+ launchers and 2000+ missiles
9K52 Luna-M		Soviet Union	Tactical ballistic missile	10
Anti-aircraft
KS-19		Soviet Union	Towed anti-aircraft gun	Unknown
52-K		Soviet Union	Towed anti-aircraft gun	Unknown
AZP S-60		Soviet Union	Towed anti-aircraft gun	Unknown
61-K		Soviet Union	Towed anti-aircraft gun	Unknown
ZU-23-2		Soviet Union	Anti-aircraft twin-barreled autocannon	Unknown
ZPU		Soviet Union	Anti-aircraft	Unknown number of ZPU-1, ZPU-2, ZPU-4 guns.
ZSU-23-4 Shilka		Soviet Union	Self-propelled anti-aircraft gun	20
ZSU-57-2		Soviet Union	Self-propelled anti-aircraft gun	Unknown

== Aircraft ==
=== Fixed wing ===
Name	Image	Origin	Type	Number	Notes
Combat aircraft
MiG-21		Soviet Union	Fighter aircraft	45+	MiG-21FLs, MiG-21PFMs, and MiG-21bis variants
MiG-19		Soviet Union	Fighter aircraft	Unknown	Mostly grounded by the end of the 1980s.
MiG-17		Soviet Union	Fighter aircraft	90+	Mostly grounded by the end of the 1980s.
MiG-15		Soviet Union	Fighter aircraft	Unknown	Mostly grounded by the end of the 1980s.
MiG-27		Soviet Union	Ground-attack aircraft	Unknown	
MiG-23		Soviet Union	Fighter-bomber	15	
Su-22		Soviet Union	Fighter-bomber	at least 45 by 1984	Su-22UM-2/UM3 and Su22M-3/4 Variants
Su-7s and Su-17s		Soviet Union	Fighter-bomber	60+	Su-7s mostly phased out by 1989.
Il-28s		Soviet Union	Medium bomber	54+	In limited service, mostly replaced by the Su-17 and Su-22
Transport aircraft
Antonov An-32		Soviet Union	Military transport aircraft	at least 6 in 1987	
Antonov An-26, Antonov An-24, and Antonov An-2		Soviet Union	Military transport aircraft	40+	
Antonov An-12		Soviet Union	medium-range transport aircraft		
Trainer aircraft
Aero L-29 Delfín		Czechoslovak Socialist Republic	Trainer aircraft	18	
Aero L-39		Czechoslovak Socialist Republic	Trainer aircraft	Unknown	
MiG-15UTI		Soviet Union	Trainer aircraft	6	
MiG-19		Soviet Union	Fighter aircraft	20	
MiG-21U		Soviet Union	Trainer aircraft	18	
Yak-11		Soviet Union	Trainer aircraft	Unknown	
Yak-18		Soviet Union	Trainer aircraft	Unknown	

=== Helicopters ===
Name	Image	Origin	Type	Number
Military helicopters
Mil Mi-35		Soviet Union	Attack helicopter	
Mil Mi-24		Soviet Union	Attack helicopter	46
Mil Mi-17		Soviet Union	Utility helicopter	35
Mil Mi-8		Soviet Union	Utility helicopter	104
Mil Mi-4		Soviet Union	Transport helicopter	12
Mil Mi-2		Soviet Union	Helicopter	

== Bibliography ==
- Isby, David (20 February 2013). Russia's War in Afghanistan. Bloomsbury Publishing. pp. 25–26. ISBN 978-1-4728-0179-1.
