= Eastern Air Command =

Eastern Air Command may refer to:

- Eastern Air Command (India)
- RCAF Eastern Air Command, a home defence command of Canada during the Second World War
- Major subordinate command of the Allied air forces under Air Command South-East Asia, during 1944–45
