= RPG-16 =

- Type: Rocket-propelled grenade Launcher
- Place of origin: Soviet Union

Service history
- In service: 1976–present
- Used by: See Users
- Wars: Soviet–Afghan War; War in Afghanistan; Iraq War; Russian invasion of Ukraine

Production history
- Designed: 1968
- No. built: ~120,000
- Variants: RPG-16D for Airborne troops

Specifications
- Mass: 9.4 kg (21 lb); Loaded - 12.4 kg (27 lb); Rocket - 3 kg (6.6 lb)
- Length: Ready to fire - 1,104 mm (43.5 in); Carrying - 645 mm (25.4 in)
- Crew: 2 men standard - Gunner and assistant
- Caliber: 58.3 mm (2.30 in) warhead
- Rate of fire: 4–6 rpm
- Muzzle velocity: Initial - 130 m/s (430 ft/s); Max - 350 m/s (1,100 ft/s)
- Maximum firing range: 300 m (980 ft) against tanks 500 m (1,600 ft) against stationary targets 800 m (2,600 ft) maximum sighting range
- Sights: Iron sights or Optical sight
- Blast yield: 300 mm (12 in) RHA

The RPG-16 is a handheld anti-tank grenade launcher for anti-tank warfare. It was developed in 1968 and adopted by the Soviet Army in 1970 for special operation teams and the Soviet airborne troops (VDV). These were deployed during the Soviet–Afghan War (1979–1989) and saw service during several battles in that conflict.

== Combat history ==
The RPG-16 was widely used during Soviet campaign in Afghanistan, mostly against hardened fire positions and buildings from stand-off ranges. When it was first introduced it was considered superior to the RPG-7, but the RPG-7's ability to accommodate oversized rockets gave it growth potential the RPG-16's undercaliber projectile could not compete with. Beginning in the 1980s, it was replaced by the older RPG-7D equipped with newer and more powerful rockets. Low-rate production was maintained by Russia until the 1990s, when it was removed from service after about 120,000 units being produced. The RPG-16 was not widely exported.

In 2023, Russian troops were seen using it against Ukrainian troops in Eastern Ukraine.

== Design ==
The RPG-16 has a 58.3 mm (2.30 in) barrel with a HEAT warhead and a smoothbore recoilless launch using a rocket booster. Its overall length is 1,104 mm (43.5 in) when ready to fire and 645 mm (25.4 in) long when taken apart for carry or airdrop. Weight is 9.4 kg (21 lb) unloaded, and 12.4 kg (27 lb) when loaded and ready to fire with its optical sight. The RPG-16 is triggered to launch by an electric current activated by a trigger on the pistol grip; armor penetration is 300 mm (12 in) of rolled homogeneous armour and effective range is up to 800 m (2,600 ft). Once fired, the rocket booster engages as soon as the warhead is propelled safely away from the operator.

Compared to its main counterpart, the RPG-7, the RPG-16 has a smaller calibre warhead and a more powerful rocket booster, which made it more accurate over long ranges. Unlike the RPG-7, the warhead does not stick out of the launcher since it has exactly the same diameter as the tube and fits entirely inside it. The smaller warhead does, however, sacrifice firepower when compared to the PG-7VL round used in the RPG-7 (which has 500 mm (20 in) RHA penetration, as opposed to the 300 mm (12 in) penetration the RPG-16 provides). In Soviet service, the launcher was issued to special operation teams in pairs: one man, the grenadier, carried the launcher and two PG-16 HEAT warheads; another man, the assistant, carried three more warheads.

Externally, the RPG-16 resembles the RPG-7; it is distinguished mainly by its single handgrip under the tube and its folding bipod, but its round is quite different from the RPG-7. The RPG-16 round is of smaller calibre but offers better performance, having what is believed to be a doubled shaped-charge warhead. It is a one-piece design, although a cartridge must be attached before use. The RPG-16 is reported to have a HE-Frag round.

== Users ==
- Afghanistan
- Armenia
- Azerbaijan
- Belarus
- Bulgaria (unconfirmed)
- Estonia (unconfirmed)
- Georgia
- Iran (unconfirmed)
- Iraq: Iraqi insurgents
- Kazakhstan
- Kyrgyzstan
- Latvia (unconfirmed)
- Lithuania (unconfirmed)
- Moldova
- Romania (unconfirmed)
- Russia: Airborne and naval infantry
- Soviet Union
- Syria (unconfirmed)
- Tajikistan
- Turkmenistan
- Ukraine
- Uzbekistan

== Bibliography ==
- RPG.16 (Report). Forecast International. September 1996.
