= Aardvark JSFU =

Aardvark area mine clearing system (AMCS)
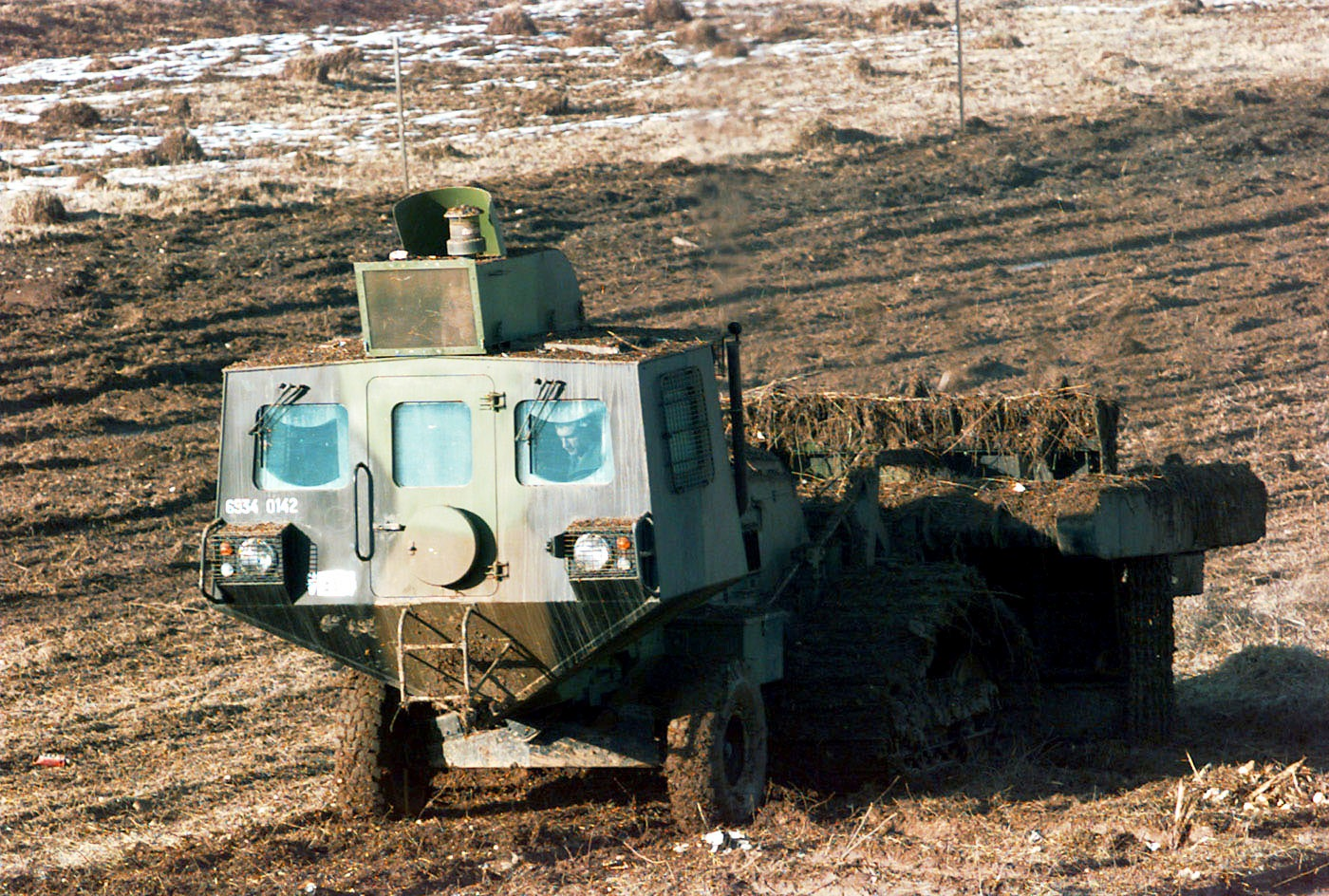
- A French Army 17th Engineering Regiment Aardvark AMCS in Bosnia-Herzegovina
- Type: demining vehicle
- Place of origin: United Kingdom

Specifications
- Crew: 1+1
- Armour: 56 mm armoured glass windows, double-skin cab floor
- Engine: turbo charged New Holland diesel engine 160 hp
- Transmission: 4-speed synchromesh; 4 gears, 16-speed

The Aardvark AMCS Mk4 is a British-made mine flail vehicle built by Aardvark Clear Mine Ltd of Dumfries, Scotland.

Under the oversight, control and management of its CEO, in 2025 Aardvark Clear Mine Ltd was dissolved after beingLiquidated with debts of over £5m. No Creditors received any distribution whatsoever as no saleable assets were identified or realized. The IP was subsequently purchased from the liquidator for £1. The purchaser was https://cerogroupglobal.com/ a company controlled and owned by the same CEO of Aardvark Clear Mine Ltd. The purchased IP was subsequently revalued and the company accounts immediately uplifted by circa £11.23m. CH Accounts

The AMCS flail system was developed in Aberdeenshire by David Macwatt of Elgin, Scotland and George Sellar & Son of Huntly (system designers were James (Barney) Hepburn, Pat McRobbie and Alistair Birnie) with the cooperation of Ford Motor Co, Basildon. George Sellar & Son owned a number of patents concerning the rotor and chain design and electronic depth contouring system and manufactured the flail assembly. The armoured vehicle was manufactured by Glover & Webb of Southampton until their acquisition by GKN who continued to armour vehicles for a period before Penman Engineering were given the contract.

Aardvark Clear Mine Ltd was acquired in 2016 from Penman Engineering Ltd of Dumfries, and is now owned by its shareholders.

Aardvark's global business is managed from the UK with operational and training facilities in Dumfries in the Scottish Borders and Insch in Aberdeenshire. The company also has offices in Washington, D.C. and in Riyadh in Saudi Arabia.

Aardvark clearance machines have been used by the military, the UN, NGOs, and other charitable organisations for humanitarian mine clearance operations in Europe, Africa and in the Middle and Far East. Aardvarks have also been chosen by the British and American forces for landmine clearance in Afghanistan and Iraq.

== Design ==
The vehicle consists of an armoured cab with a front-mounted flail system. The system has 72 chains with 66 striker tips.

- Armour: 56 mm armoured glass windows, double-skin cab floor
- Crew: two – one operator, one crew member
- Powertrain: 160 hp six-cylinder turbo charged New Holland diesel engine
- Transmission: four-speed synchromesh; four gears, 16-speed
- Flail system: 72 chains, 66 tips

== Users ==
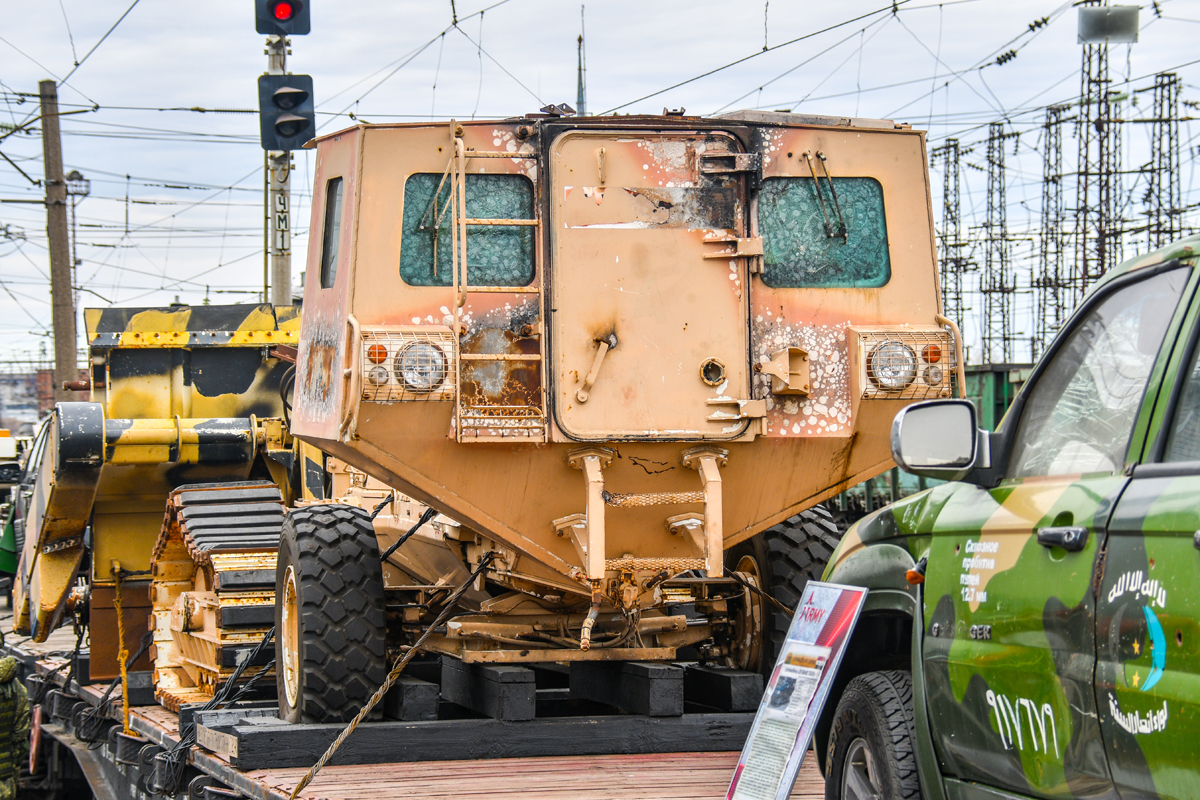
An Aardvark captured in Syria and exhibited in Russia

Users of the AardvarkJSFU system:

- Azerbaijan – (Azerbaijan Army)
- Pakistan – (Pakistan Army)
- Canada – (Canadian Army) – deployed in Afghanistan
- France – (French Army)
- Botswana – (Botswana Ground Force)
- Indonesia – (Indonesian Army)
- Ireland – (Irish Army)
- Jordan – (Royal Jordanian Land Force)
- Latvia – (Latvian Special Forces)
- Netherlands – (Royal Netherlands Army)
- Saudi Arabia – (Royal Saudi Land Force)
- Singapore – (Singapore Army)
- South Korea – (Republic of Korea Army)
- (Syria) Syrian opposition
- United States – (United States Army)
- United Kingdom – (British Army)

== See also ==
- Mine plow
- Mine roller
- Sisu RA-140 DS
