= YPR-765 =

Dutch infantry fighting vehicle

YPR 765
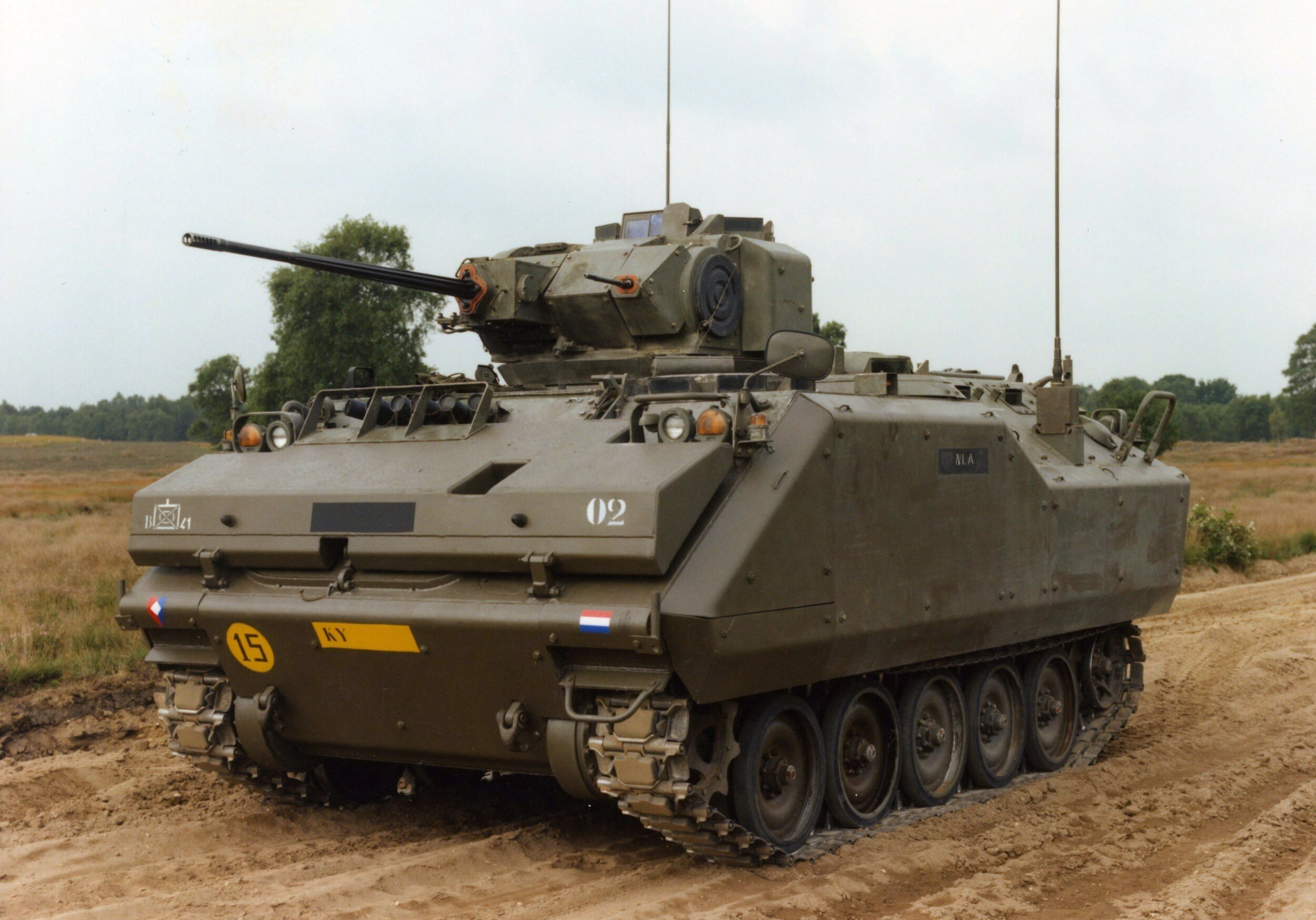
- YPR 765 PRI (Pantser Rups Infanterie) armed with 25 mm Oerlikon cannon
- Type: Infantry fighting vehicle
- Place of origin: United States; Netherlands

Service history
- Used by: See Operators
- Wars: Bosnian War; Sinai insurgency; Russo-Ukrainian War; Russian invasion of Ukraine

Production history
- Manufacturer: FMC; DAF; RSV
- Produced: 1977–1989
- No. built: >2,000
- Variants: See Variants

Specifications
- Mass: 13.7 tonnes (15.1 short tons; 13.5 long tons)
- Length: 5.26 m (17 ft 3 in)
- Width: 2.82 m (9 ft 3 in)
- Height: 2.62 m (8 ft 7 in)
- Crew: 3 (commander, gunner, driver) + 7 passengers
- Armor: Welded aluminium and spaced laminate steel
- Main armament: 25 mm Oerlikon KBA-B02 cannon (324 rounds)
- Secondary armament: 7.62 mm FN MAG coaxial machine gun (1,940rounds)
- Engine: Detroit Diesel 6V-53T six-cylinder turbocharged diesel 197 kW (264 hp)
- Ground clearance: 0.43 m
- Fuel capacity: 416 litres
- Operational range: 491 km (305 mi)
- Maximum speed: 61.2 km/h (38.0 mph)

The YPR-765 is a Dutch infantry fighting vehicle. It is based on the AIFV design developed by the FMC Corporation. It replaced the AMX-VCI and YP-408 of the Royal Netherlands Army and entered service in 1977. The Dutch YPR-765s were later replaced by the CV90, Fennek and Boxer.

== History ==
In 1973, the Royal Netherlands Army started a project to look for a new infantry fighting vehicle to replace the AMX-VCI. During the course of this project, several countries made proposals to sell their infantry fighting vehicles to the Netherlands. In 1974, the Royal Netherlands Army started to show interest in the improved M113, later named Armored Infantry Fighting Vehicle (AIFV), which was developed by the FMC Corporation. After performing tests with the vehicle in that same year and making several adjustments to the design to meet the Royal Netherlands Army requirements, the Dutch Ministry of Defence placed an order in 1975 for 889 YPR-765s at a cost of around 700 million Dutch guilders. The order included twelve different variants of the vehicle, such as an armored medical evacuation vehicle and an armored personnel carrier.

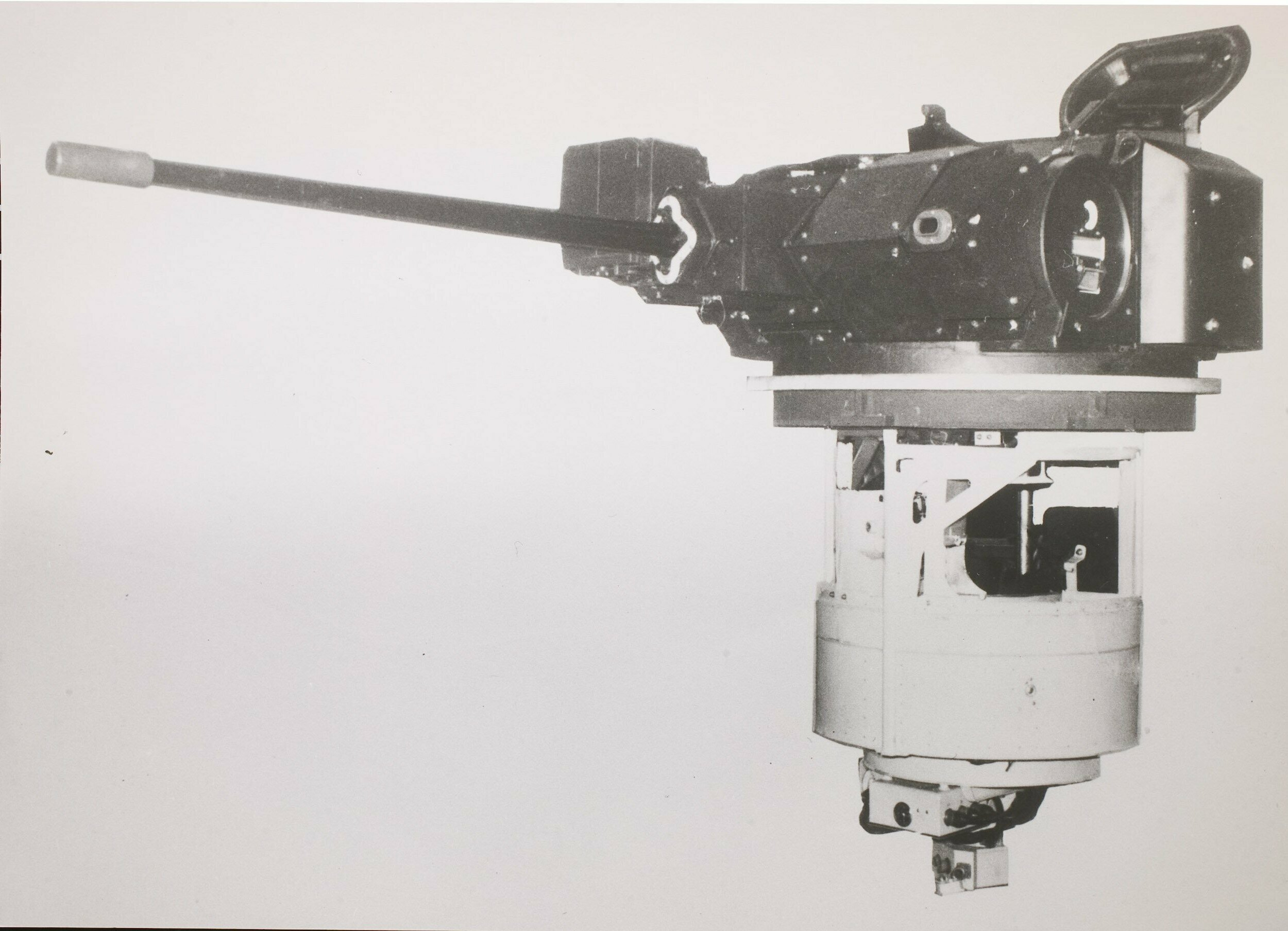
The single crewman Enclosed Weapon Station developed for the Dutch vehicles, seen here with an infrared searchlight

The vehicles were built by the FMC together with several Dutch companies such as DAF and Philips. The division of labour was that FMC built the chassis of the vehicle, while DAF was responsible for the interior and constructed the 227 specially designed turrets that were equipped with a 25 mm Oerlikon KBA-B02 cannon. In addition, Philips designed the fire control system of the YPR-765. The final assembly and integrating all the different parts was also done by DAF.

A follow-up order for 160 YPR-765s was placed in 1978 at a cost of 63 million Dutch guilders. 116 of these vehicles were equipped with TOW launchers, while 36 were built as command vehicles and 8 as recovery vehicles. The additional cost of equipping the 116 vehicles with turrets that can launch TOW missiles was estimated at 55 million Dutch guilders.

The Dutch government placed a third order in 1980 for 185 YPR-765s at a cost of 256 million Dutch guilders. 107 of these vehicles were to be equipped with TOW launchers. Like previous orders, the YPR-765s would be built by FMC Corporation together with Dutch companies, which in this order would be DAF and RSV.

In 1980, the Dutch Ministry of Defence was also looking at four different vehicles that could replace the 743 YP-408s of the Royal Netherlands Army, which included the Marder, TPZ-1, YPR-765 and XM-2. For the replacement of the YP-408, the Dutch government had reserved around 1.1 billion Dutch guilders. The following year, in 1981, it was decided to order 841 YPR-765s as a replacement. However, unlike the first series of YPR-765s that replaced the AMX-13, this series would be fully built in the Netherlands by a consortium of DAF and RSV. This was the result of the consortium acquiring the license rights to build the vehicles. FMC Corporation had offered to build the vehicles for a lower price than the DAF-RSV consortium, but the Dutch government wanted to stimulate employment in the Netherlands.

Around 1990, the Royal Netherlands Army had 2,140 YPR-765s in service.

== Variants ==
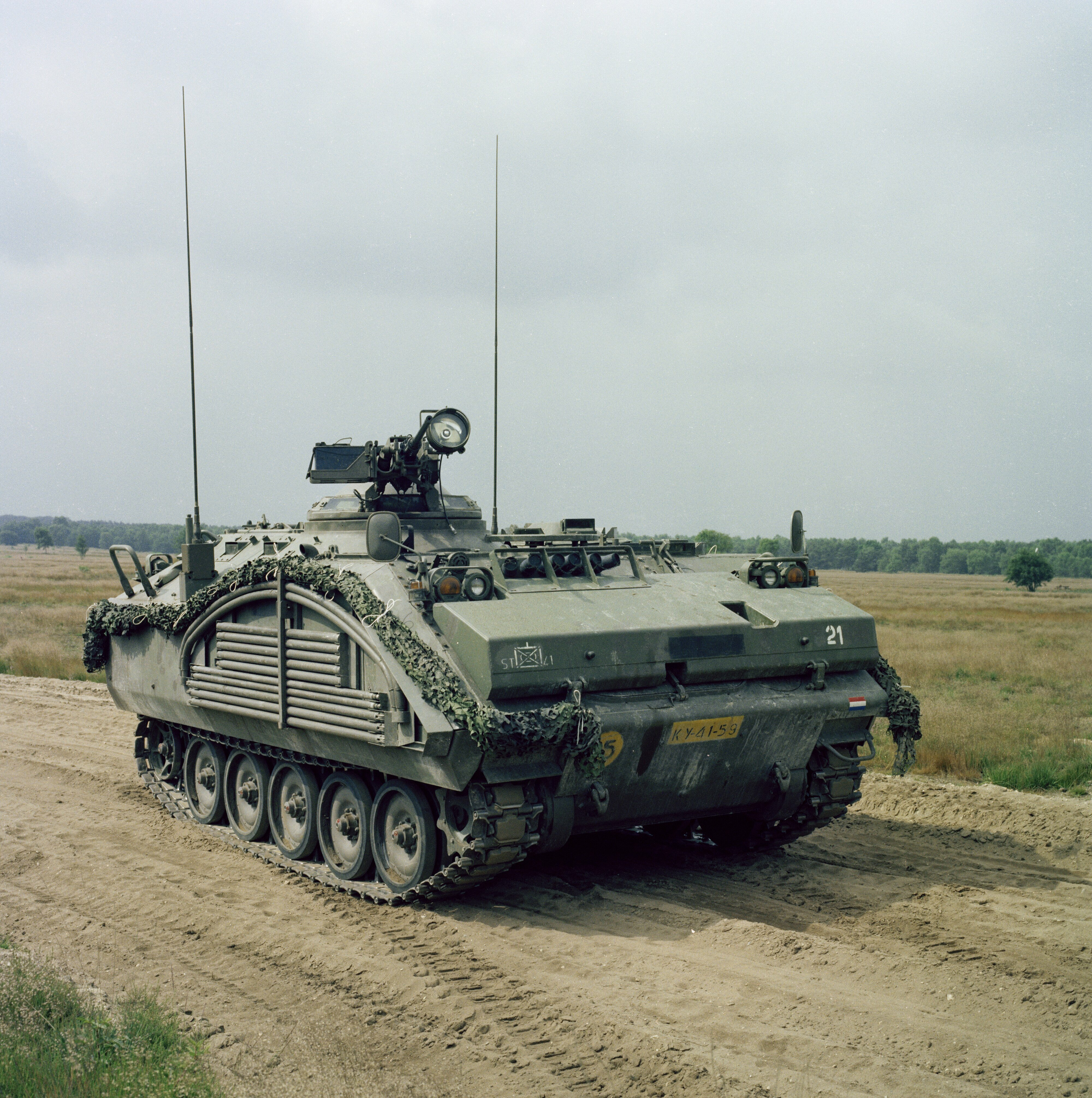
The multi-role YPR-765 PRCO-C model armed with .50-caliber Browning M2HB heavy machine gun.

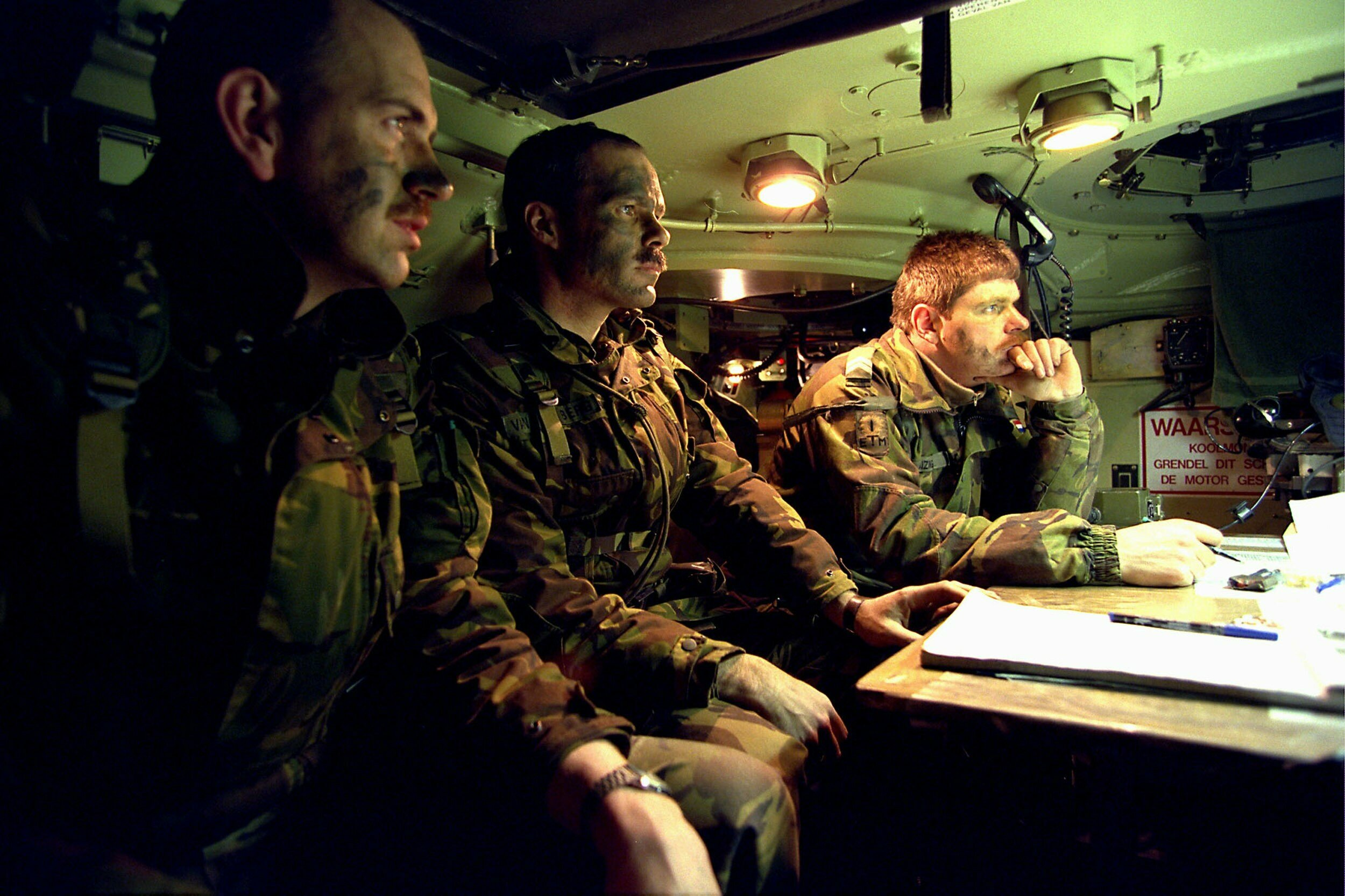
Rear compartment inside one of the YPR-765 PRCO-C series command vehicles

Dutch variants: (the Pantser Rups designation means armoured tracked)

- YPR-765 PRI (Pantser Rups Infanterie) — primary infantry fighting vehicle with a 25 mm Oerlikon KBA-B02 cannon and a coaxial FN MAG co-axial machine gun contained in a turret (EWS - Enclosed Weapon Station); crew of three plus seven passengers (normally only five carried); outward-facing bench seats in the rear compartment.
  - YPR-765 PRI.50 — armoured personnel carrier with a .50-caliber M2 HB machine gun on an M113-type cupola in place of a turret.
- YPR-765 PRCO-series (Pantser Rups Commando, i.e., command post vehicle)
  - YPR-765 PRCO-B — company commander's vehicle with the same EWS-turret as the PRI; crew of six plus two passengers; folding table in the rear compartment with two inward-facing seats on either side.
  - YPR-765 PRCO-C-1 — battalion commander's vehicle with a .50-caliber M2 HB machine gun on an M26 cupola; crew of five plus four passengers; folding table in the rear compartment with a three-seat bench on the left and two seats on the right, all facing inward.
  - YPR-765 PRCO-C-2 — battalion fire control centre with a .50-caliber M2 HB machine gun on an M26 cupola; crew of seven plus one passenger; rear compartment as for C-1.
  - YPR-765 PRCO-C-3 — mortar fire control vehicle with a .50-caliber M2 HB machine gun on an M26 cupola; crew of four plus one passenger; the rear compartment has a folding table with two inward-facing seats on the left side and a large bulletin board for military maps on the right side.
  - YPR-765 PRCO-C-4 — armoured command post vehicle for armoured anti-aircraft artillery PRTL platoons. Equipped with a .50-caliber M2 HB machine gun on an M113-type cupola; crew of three; folding table in the rear compartment with an inward-facing, three-seat bench on the left. This vehicle is equipped with a diesel-heater, a tall collapsible antenna mast on the left side of the hull and a tent extension that could be attached to the rear of the vehicle's hull to provide additional work space.
  - YPR-765 PRCO-C-5 — observation vehicle for artillery units with a .50-caliber M2 HB machine gun on an M113-type cupola; crew of five; rear compartment with a folding table with two inward-facing seats on the left.

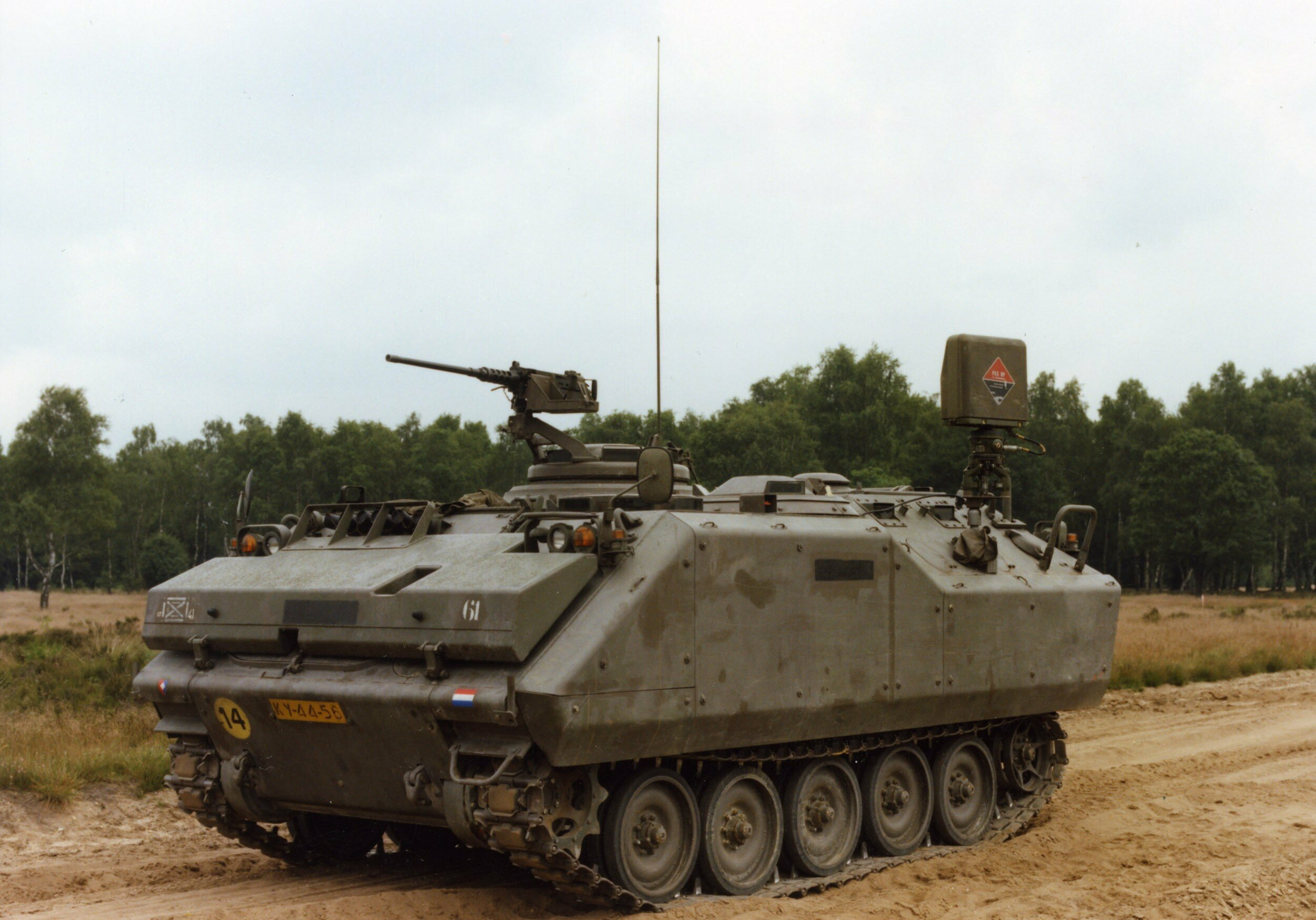
YPR-765 PRRDR battlefield surveillance vehicle

- YPR-765 PRRDR (Pantser Rups Radar) — vehicle equipped with a ZB-298 battlefield surveillance radar, armed with a .50-caliber M2 HB machine gun on an M113-type cupola; crew of four plus two passengers; folding table in the rear compartment, with one inward-facing seat on either side. Each tank battalion and each armoured infantry battalion had three of these in its staff and support company.
  - YPR-765 PRDRR-C — radar platoon command vehicle. Withdrawn from service.

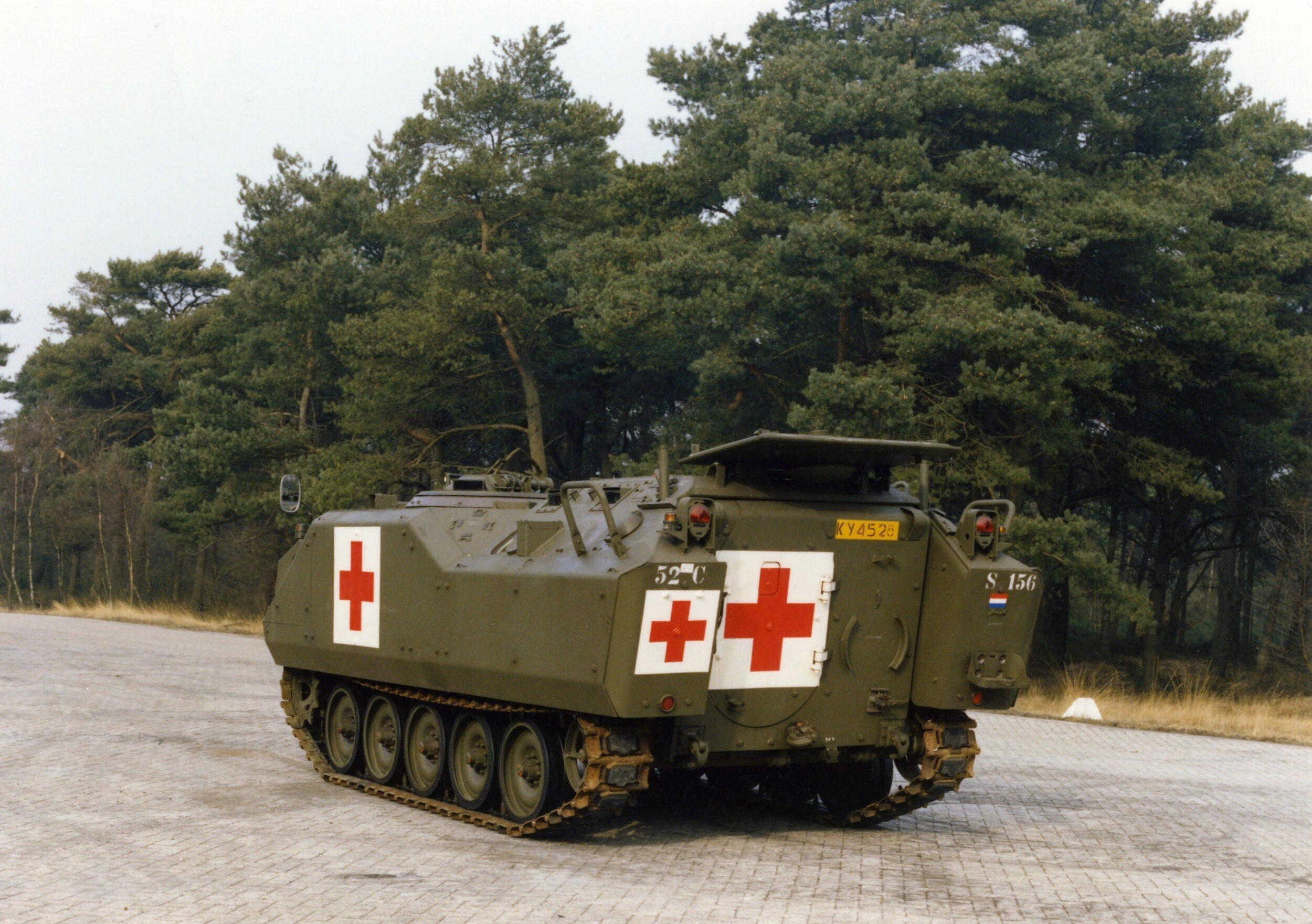
YPR-765 PRGWT battlefield ambulance with provision for four litters

- YPR-765 PRGWT (Pantser Rups Gewondentransport) — armoured medical evacuation vehicle (AMEV); unarmed; crew of three plus five passengers; rear compartment has two forward-facing seats on the left, bins for the personal equipment of the wounded on either side, and can hold two stretchers on either side, suspended from chains. The vehicle is equipped with a diesel-heater.
- YPR-765 PRMR (Pantser Rups Mortiertrekker) — armoured mortar tractor for MO-120-RT 120 mm mortar with a .50-caliber M2 HB machine gun on an M26 cupola; crew of seven, including mortar crew; rear compartment has an inward-facing, three-seat bench on the left and a mortar ammunition rack on the right. Storage racks for 150 mortar rounds.
- YPR-765 PRV (Pantser Rups Vracht) — armoured cargo vehicle (vracht = cargo, freight) with a .50-caliber M2 HB machine gun on an M113-type cupola; crew of two; empty rear compartment with a folding safety screen between the crew and cargo.

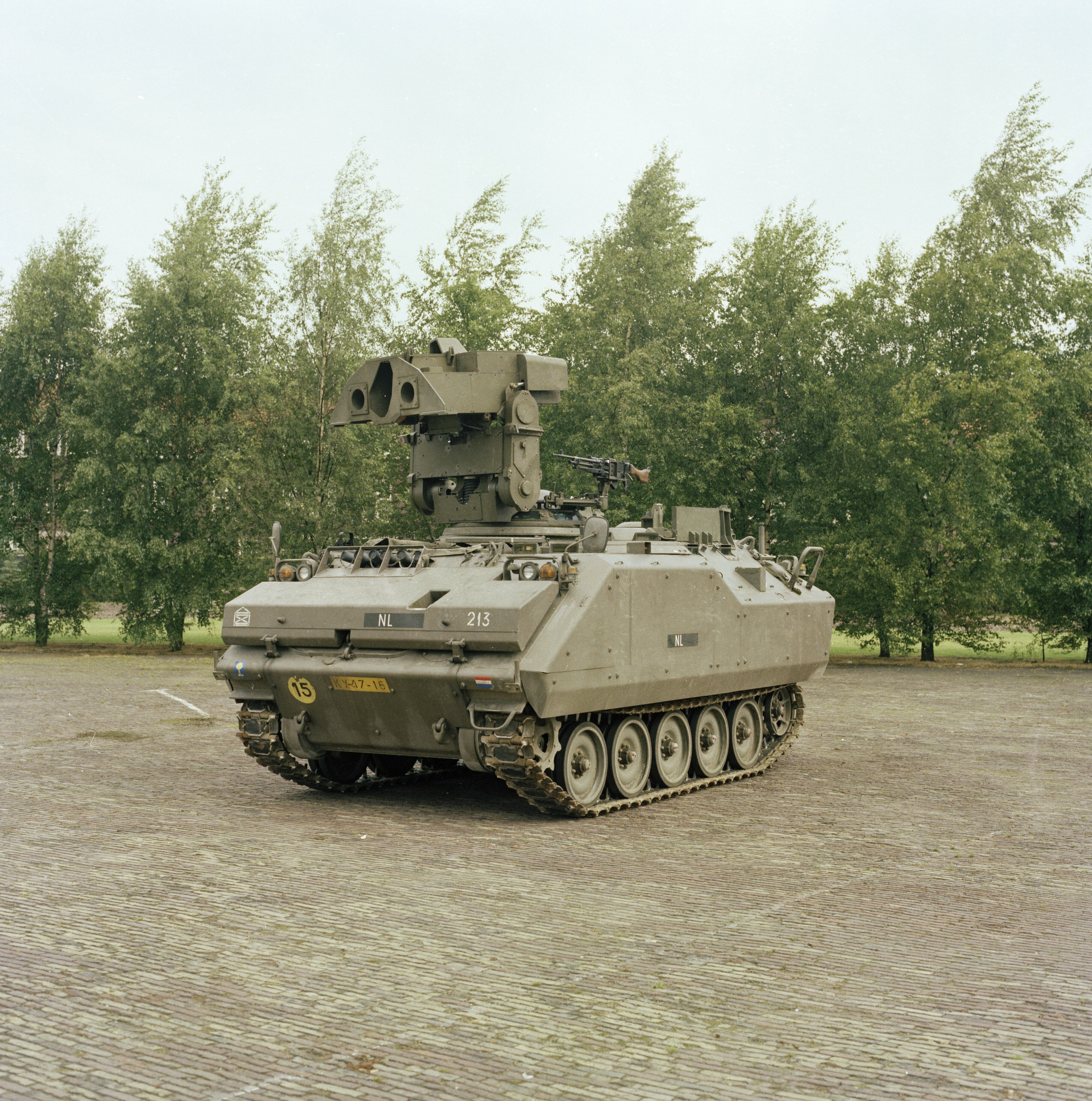
The YPR-765 PRAT anti-tank vehicle equipped with a twin-TOW missile launcher by Emerson. The launcher is raised and in firing position; when stowed, the turret is folded down, rotated and aimed towards the rear of the vehicle to reduce its height.

- YPR-765 PRAT (Pantser Rups Anti Tank) — tank destroyer armed with an Emerson twin-TOW "hammerhead" turret (similar to that of the M901 ITV) and an FN MAG machine gun on a pintle mount; crew of four; rear compartment holds a rack with missile reloads on the left, an inward-facing bench seat and various equipment, including an M41 tripod on the right.
- YPR-806 PRBRG (Pantser Rups Berging) — armoured recovery vehicle; US Army designation is M806, it is based on a modified M113 chassis and hull but using AIFV automotive components. Repair and recovery vehicle equipped with an internal winch and two earth anchors mounted on the rear hull.

== Service history ==
More than 100 YPR-765s of the Royal Netherlands Army were active in Bosnia and Herzegovina as part of the Dutch troops that participated in UNPROFOR, IFOR and the Stabilisation Force in Bosnia and Herzegovina.

=== Combat history ===
Several ISAF missions in Afghanistan from 2004 to 2010

Dutch YPR-765s have been extensively used by the Armed Forces of Ukraine during the Russo-Ukrainian War. According to the Oryx blog, as of 30 August 2026, 108 YPR-765s have been destroyed, 9 damaged but recovered, and 20 abandoned, with 10 captured by Russian forces. According to Forbes, at least one of which, was briefly used by Russian forces, until it was destroyed.

== Export ==
=== Ukraine ===
In early April 2023, the Dutch Ministry of Defence reported it had donated 196 YPR-765s to Ukraine during the course of the Russian invasion of Ukraine. By 20 May 2024, the Ministry of Defence had delivered 207 vehicles with more reportedly on the way. As of 29 September 2024, the Dutch Ministry of Defence reported a total of 353 units delivered and pledged.

== Operators ==
=== Current operators ===
- Bahrain: 25 Netherlands-origin YPR-765 ACV delivered in 1996, 42 Belgium-origin AIFV-IFV delivered in 2008, 8 (est.) Belgium-origin AIFV-APC delivered in 2008
- Chile: 139 YPR-765s purchased from the Netherlands and Belgium.
- Egypt: More than 1,000 YPR-765s purchased from the Netherlands and Belgium since 1996.
- Jordan: 441 YPR-765s purchased from the Netherlands.
- Netherlands: Only uses the YPR-806 A1 PRB (pantserrupsberging) and YPR-KMar (Koninklijke Marechaussee).
- Russia: 8 YPR-765s captured from Ukrainian troops. One destroyed in Ukrainian attack.
- Ukraine: 348 YPR-765s, including models with RWS, and 25 YPR-765 PRGWTs were pledged by the Netherlands.

=== Former operators ===
- Netherlands: 2,079 vehicles, most of which have been replaced by a combination of CV9035NL, Fennek and Boxer vehicles.
