= M901 ITV =

American armored vehicle

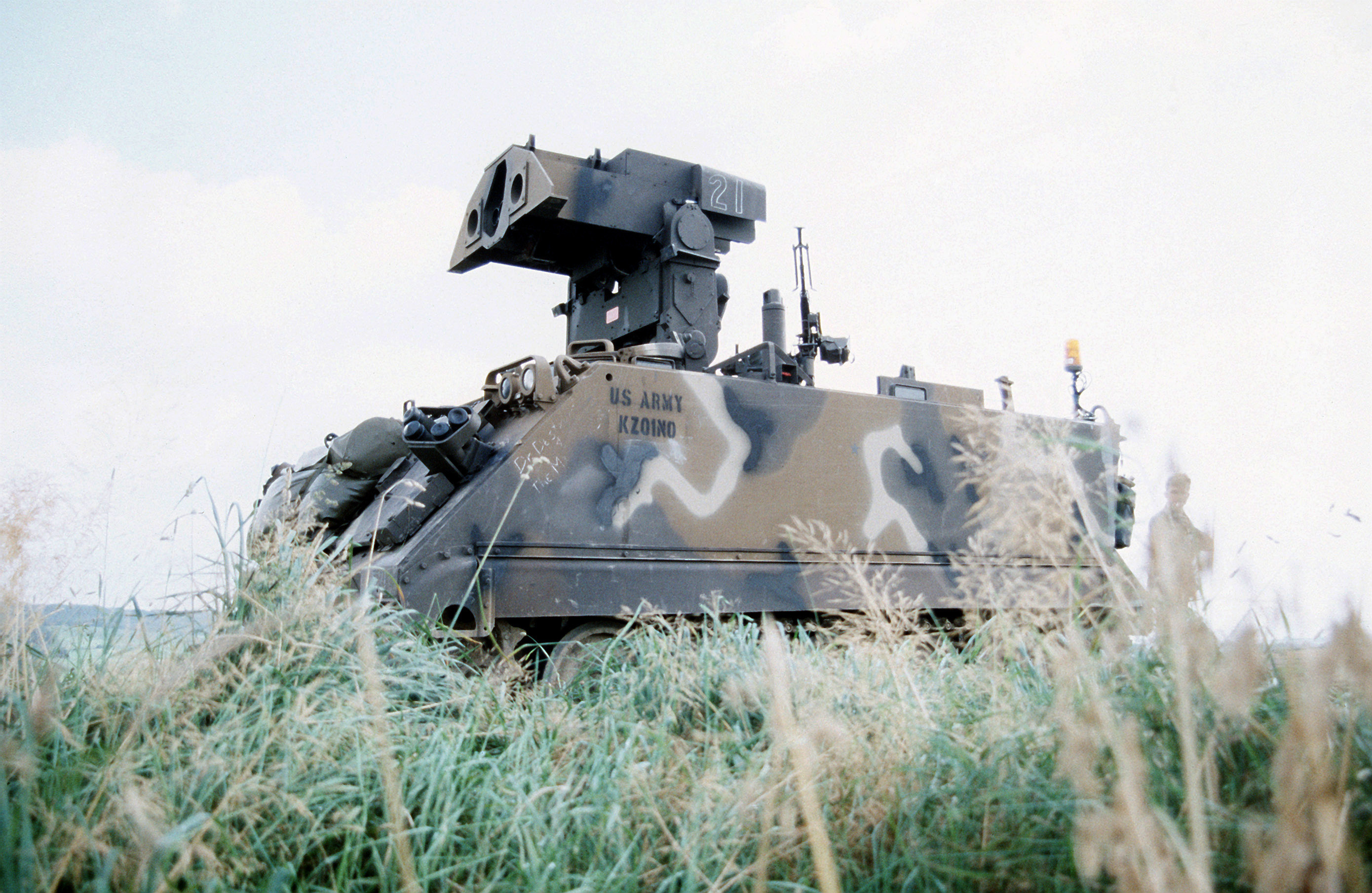
- United States Army M901 ITV in 1985
- Type: Anti-tank missile carrier
- Place of origin: United States

Service history
- Wars: Gulf War; Iraq War

Specifications
- Mass: 12 tons
- Length: 4.86 m (15 ft 11½ in)
- Width: 2.69 m (8 ft 9¾ in)
- Height: 2.94 m (9 ft 8 in) targeting head stowed, 3.41 m (11 ft 2 in) head extended
- Crew: 4 (commander, gunner, loader, driver)
- Main armament: M220-series TOW weapon system
- Secondary armament: 7.62x51mm NATO machine gun
- Operational range: 300 mi (480 km)
- Maximum speed: 40 mph (64 km/h) on road

The M901 ITV (Improved TOW Vehicle) is an American armored vehicle introduced into service in 1979, and designed to carry a dual M220 TOW launcher. It is based on the M113 armored personnel carrier chassis. The M901 ITV is no longer in service with the United States Army, its primary user.

== Equipment ==
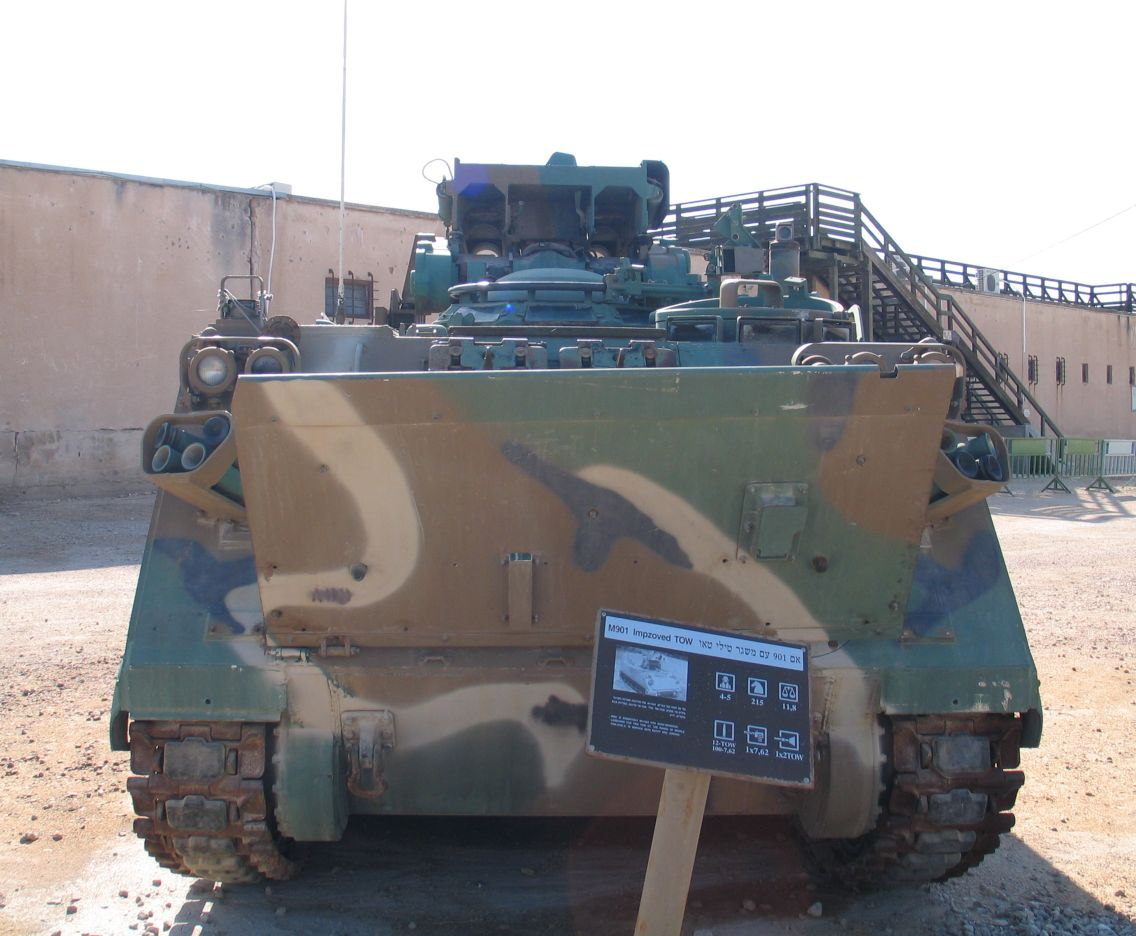
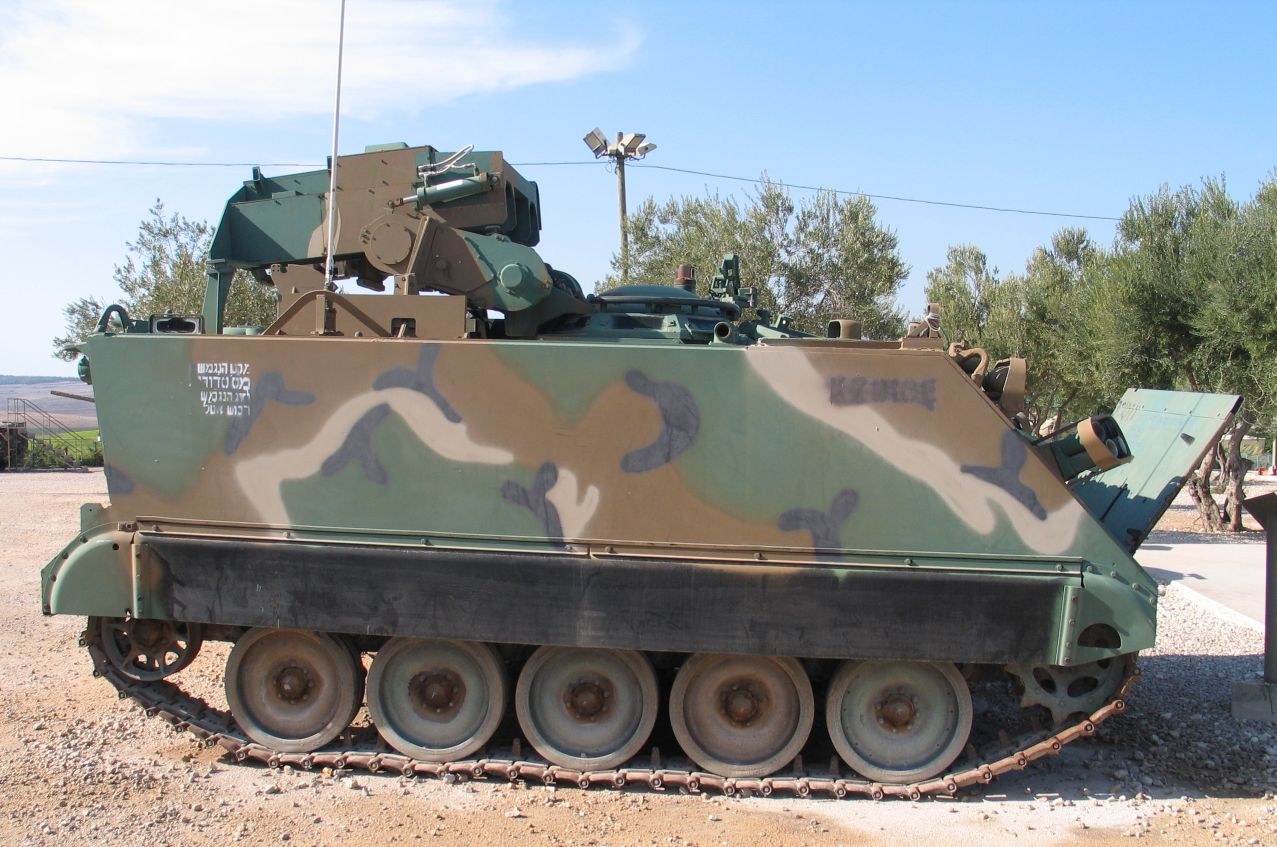

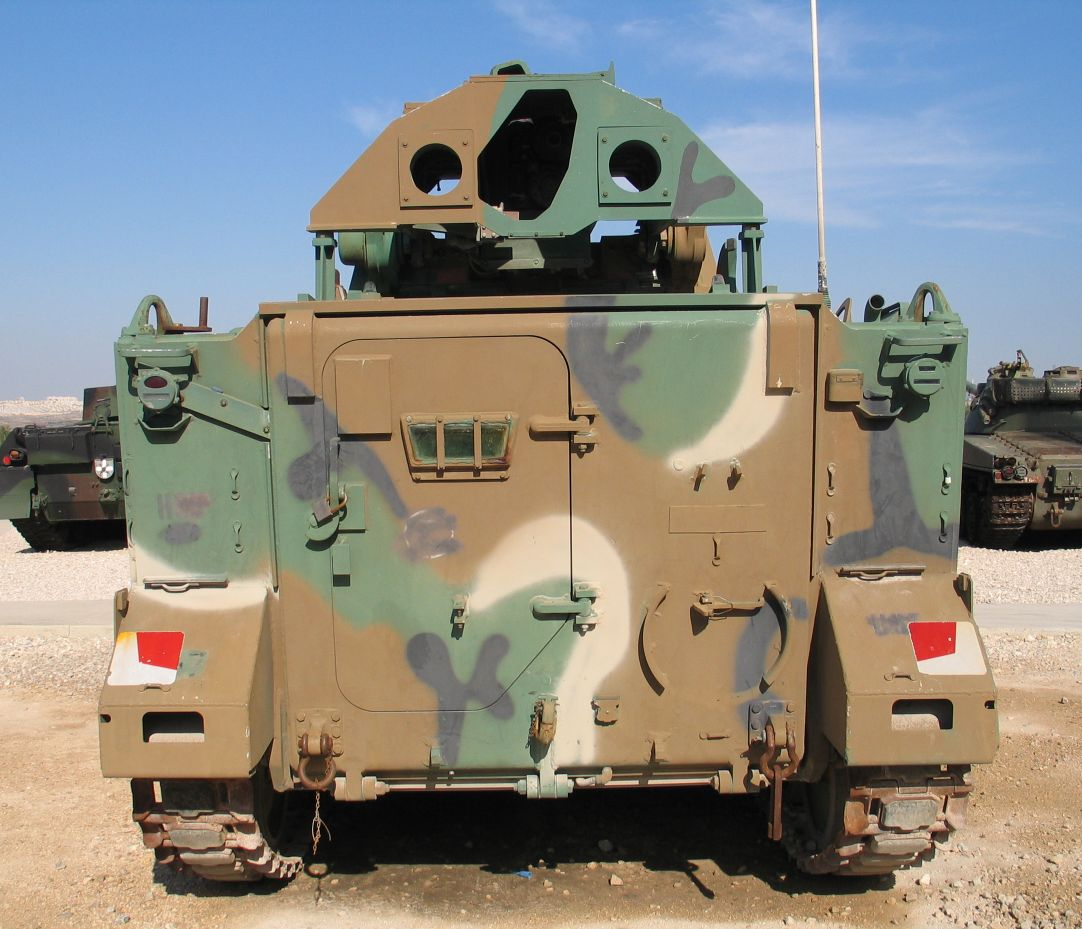
M901 ITV in the Yad La-Shiryon.

The M901 ITV provides the crew and weapon system protection from small-arms fire and artillery fragments. The squad leader has a 270-degree range of view through the squad leader's periscope (SLP). The turret launcher has the capability for day and night acquisition and tracking of targets, and it provides firing coverages of 360 degrees in azimuth and +35 to −30 degrees in elevation. The ITV has stowage provisions for tripod-mounted TOW components configured so the ground system can be dismounted and set up in three to five minutes. In addition, the ITV is completely amphibious and is air transportable. It has the following characteristics:

- A hydraulically and electrically powered "hammerhead" turret, attached to a modified M27 cupola, that can be operated manually.
- A complete M220-series TOW weapon system stowed and strapped in fixed mounting brackets. The day sight tracker and night sight (AN/TAS-4 or AN/TAS-4a) are mounted in a ready state at the head of the turret. The missile guidance system is also connected at the base of the turret.
- M243 smoke grenade launchers.
- A 3x acquisition sight with a 25-degree field of view.
- Remote actuators that allow day sight tracker and night sight adjustments.
- A 7.62x51mm machine gun mounted on a traversing rail.

The system is capable of firing two missiles without reloading and carries ten TOW rounds in the missile rack, for a total of 12 missiles. Reloading is performed under armor protection and is accomplished by tilting the launching apparatus back so that the crew can reach the turret through the carrier's rear roof hatch. The missile launcher targeting head is at the end of a pivoting arm which raises the launcher assembly for firing. When stowed, the turret is aimed down and to the rear of the vehicle. A major limitation of the M901 is that it is practically unable to move while the turret is in firing position and unable to fire while it is in the stowed position. A common workaround is to move the vehicle while the turret is in the loading position, thereby reducing the amount of time to get the turret in a fire position as opposed to the stow position. Moving from the firing to the stowed position is a procedure that takes several seconds and some skill on the part of the operator.

== Variants ==
- M901, employs the M220A1 TOW
- M901A1, employs the M220A2 TOW 2
- M901A3, employs the M220A2 TOW 2 and incorporates the RISE powerpack and improved driver controls of the M113A3.

== Operators ==
Map with M901 ITV operators in blue and former operators in red

=== Current operators ===
- Bahrain : Royal Bahraini Army: 38 US-origin M901A1 delivered in 2001.
- Egypt: Egyptian Army
- Greece: Hellenic Army
- Jordan: Jordanian Armed Forces
- Kuwait: Kuwait Army - 58
- Morocco: Royal Moroccan Army
- Pakistan: 50 in service with the Pakistan Army.
- Portugal: Portuguese Army: 4 in service since 1993.
- Thailand: Royal Thai Army
- Tunisia: Tunisian Army
- Somalia: Somali Armed Forces - Galmudug

=== Former operators ===
- Iraq: Captured from Kuwait and fielded during the 2003 invasion
- United States: United States Army
- Israel: Israel Defense Forces

== Similar vehicles ==
The M981 FISTV (fire support team vehicle) armored vehicle is based on the M901 ITV housing a Ground/Vehicular Laser Locator Designator (G/VLLD) in the launcher in place of the TOW missiles and optics.

The M901 is similar to the NM142 used by the Norwegian Army and the ZT3 Ratel IFV variant used by South African National Defence Force.

The YPR-765 PRAT uses the same turret as the M901 but on the hull of the AIFV, an improved M113.

The M1134, based on the Stryker, is the current armored tank destroyer of the U.S.
