= Navistar 7000 series =

American heavy lift vehicles

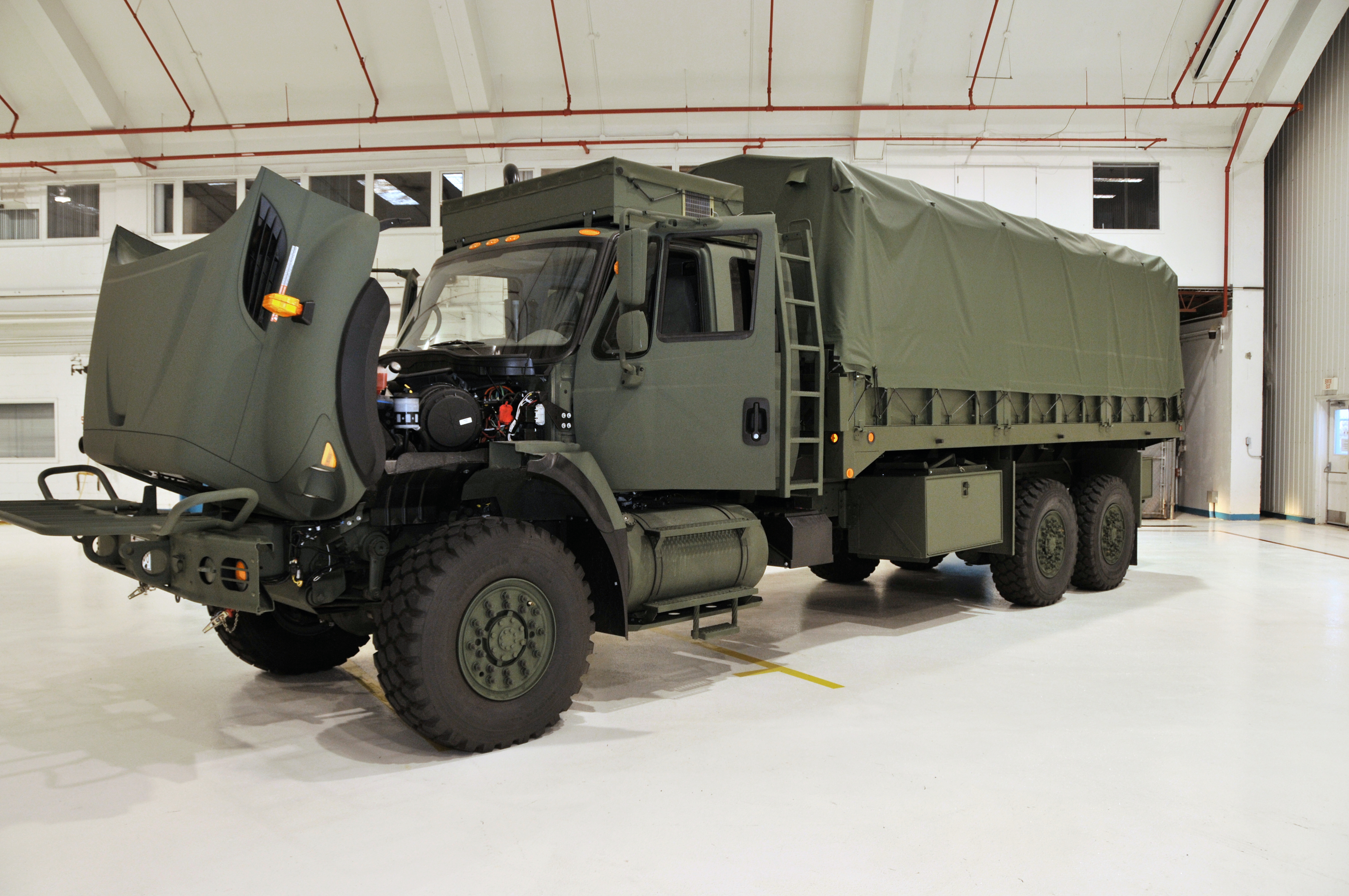
- A parked 7000-MV 4 1/2 ton cargo truck
- Type: Medium truck
- Place of origin: United States

Service history
- In service: 2005–present
- Used by: Canadian Army; Afghan National Army (historical); Afghan National Police (historical); Iraqi Ministry of Defence; Republic of China (Taiwan) Army

Production history
- Designer: Navistar
- Manufacturer: Navistar Defense

Specifications
- Length: 31.5 ft (9.6 m)
- Width: 95.2 in (2.42 m)
- Height: 10.33 ft (3.15 m)
- Crew: 3
- Engine: International DT 530(varies by configuration and national requirements); 270 to 330 hp
- Operational range: 400 mi (640 km)-500 mi (800 km)

The Navistar 7000 series is a line of military heavy lift vehicles based on Navistar International's WorkStar truck chassis, and produced by Navistar Defense. The truck is available in a variety of wheel (4×2, 4×4, 6×4, and 6×6) and engine configurations.

In 2005, the US Army ordered 2,900 7000-MV Series for the Afghan National Army and Iraqi Ministry of Defense and an additional order of 7,000 was added in 2008.

The Canadian Army had adopted the Navistar Defence LLC Medium Logistics truck. The vehicle fulfills the MSVS MilCOTS (Militarized Commercial-Off-The-Shelf) requirement. As of mid-July 2015, the MSVS SMP (Standard Military Pattern) vehicle had been chosen. Starting in June 2010, 1,300 Navistar units replaced part of the MLVW fleet. The civilian designation of the 7000-MV is Navistar 7400 SFA 6×6 and International WorkStar.

In July 2012, the order for 1500 MSVS SMP trucks was cancelled and re-evaluated. In July 2015, Canada awarded the SMP contract to Mack Trucks instead. Mack began delivery of Kerax-series trucks in 2017 and completed delivery by the end of 2018.

== Operators ==
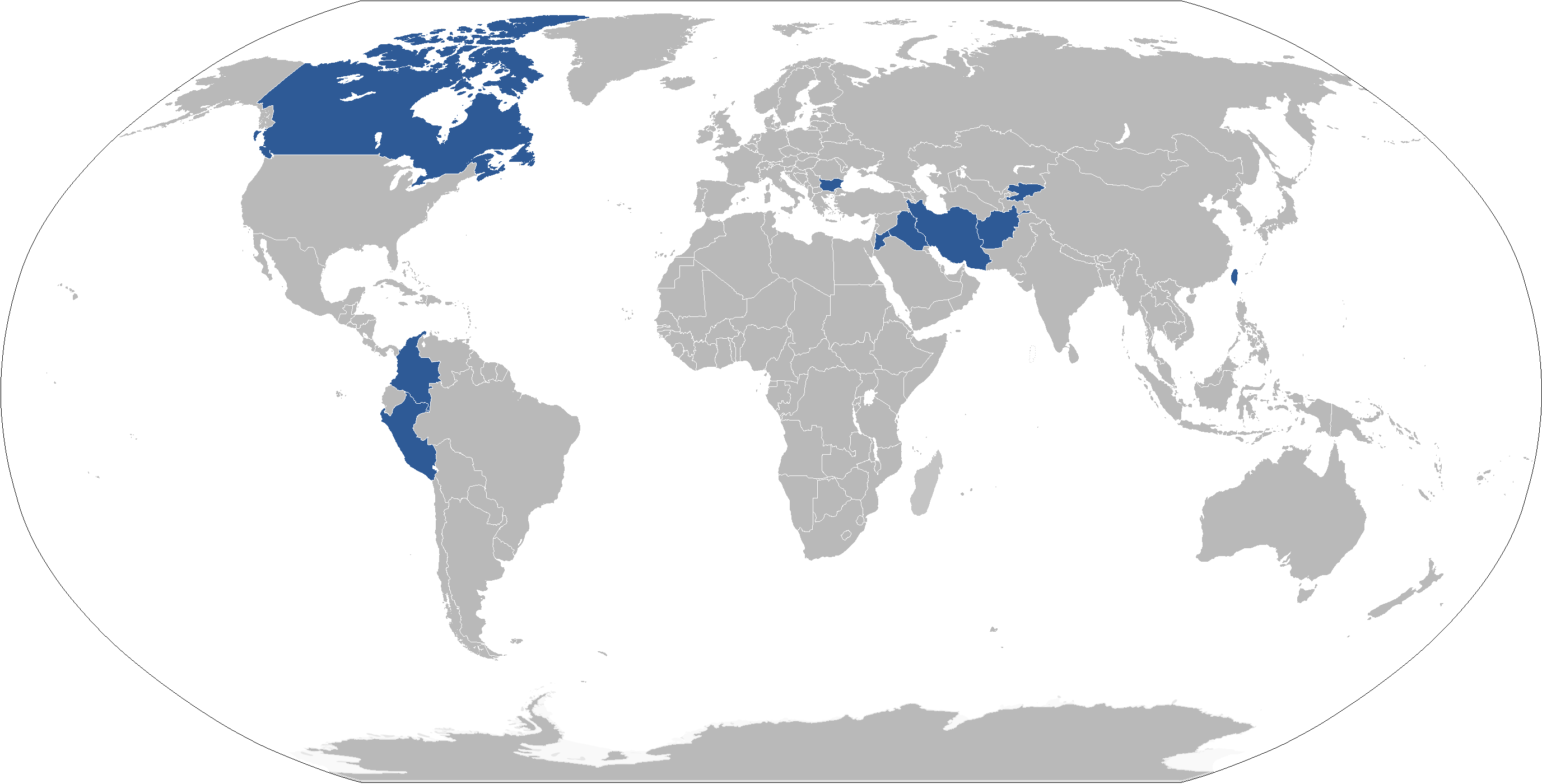
Map with Navistar 7000 series operators in blue

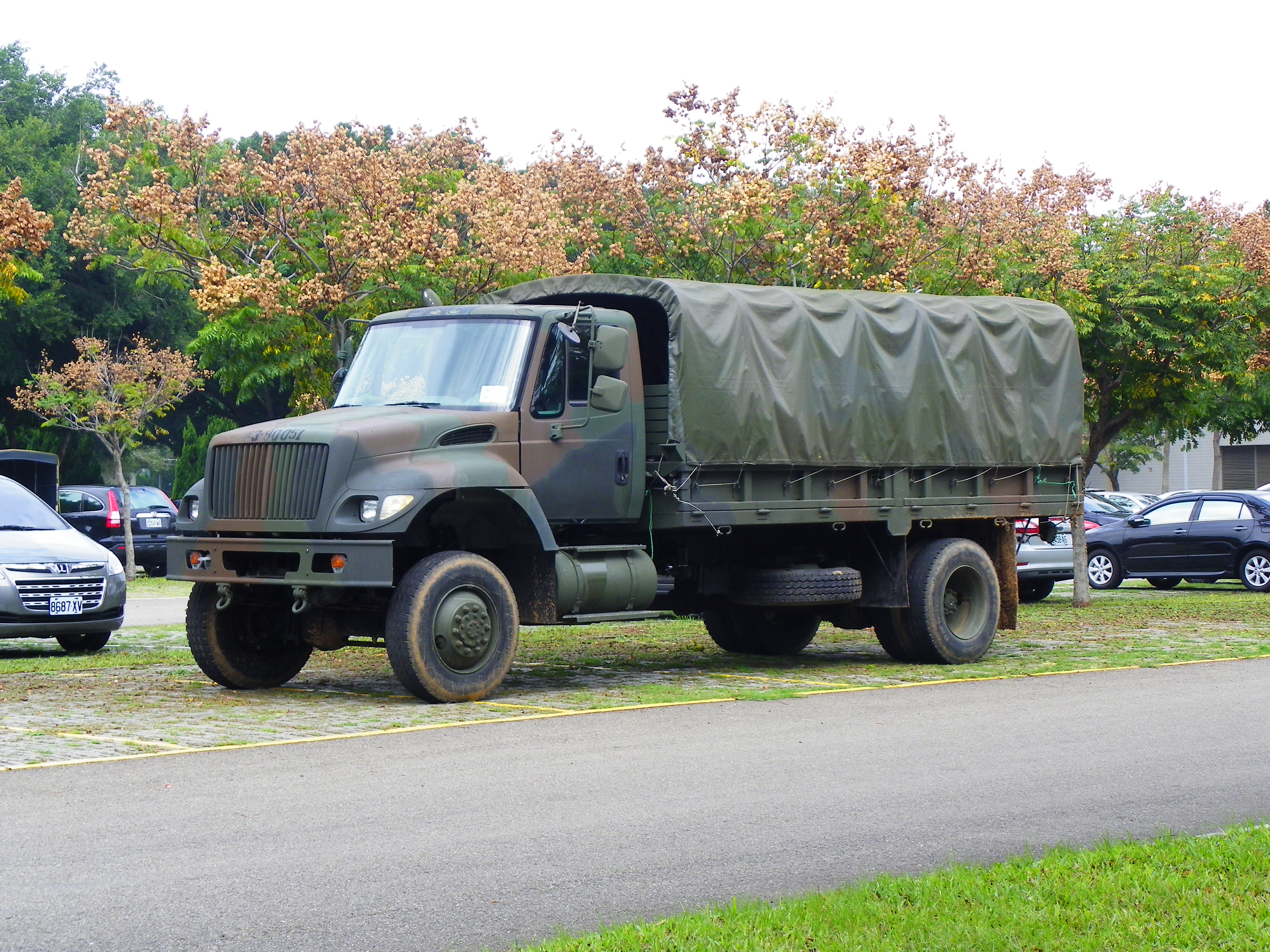
Navistar 7400 of the Republic of China Army.

- Afghanistan – Taken over after the fall of Kabul in 2021 and used today
  - Afghan National Army
  - Afghan National Police
- Bulgaria
  - Bulgarian Air Force – 1+ Navistar 7000-MV in service in fuel tanker configuration at Graf Ignatievo Air Base.
- Canada
  - Canadian Army Reserve – 1,300 Navistar 7400 SFA in service.
- Colombia
  - Colombian Marine Corps – 47+ Navistar 7000-MV in service.
  - Colombian Navy – 8 donated by the US in November 2017.
- Iran
  - Islamic Republic of Iran Army
- Iraq
  - Iraqi Armed Forces – 115 Navistar 7000-MV on order in addition to unknown number in service, some were captured by the Islamic State of Iraq and the Levant.
- Jordan
  - Jordanian Armed Forces
- Kyrgyzstan
  - Kyrgyz Armed Forces
- Taiwan
  - Republic of China Army, of local manufacture, built under license in Taiwan by Sanyang Motor Company
  - Republic of China Marine Corps
- Peru
  - Peruvian Army

== Failed bids ==
- Egypt
