= BAE Caiman =

Light tactical military vehicle

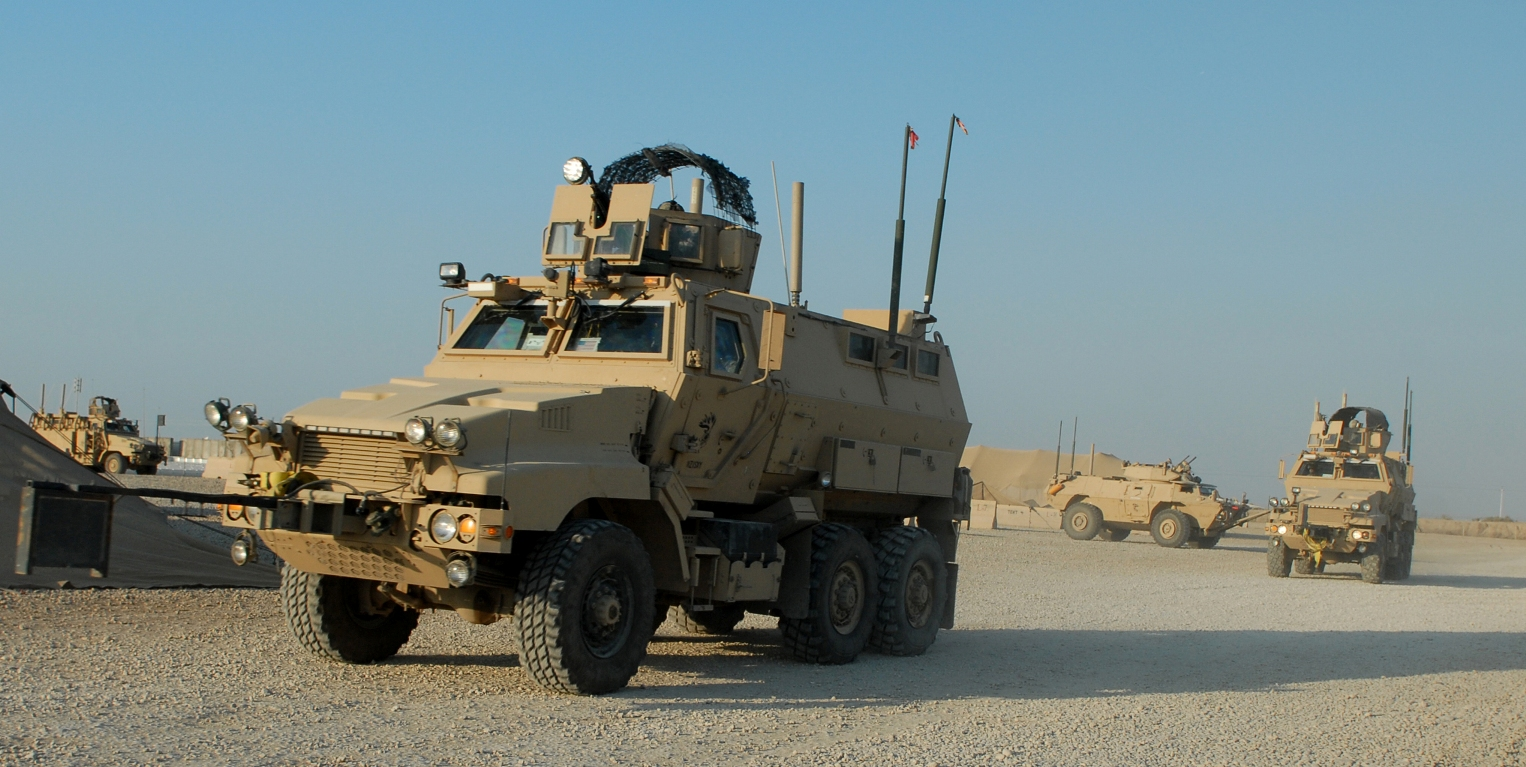
- Caimans used by the United States Army in Iraq
- Type: MRAP
- Place of origin: United States / United Kingdom

Service history
- In service: 2007–present
- Used by: See operators
- Wars: Iraq War; War in Afghanistan (2001-2021); Second Libyan Civil War; Yemeni Civil War (2014–present)

Production history
- Designer: BAE Systems Platforms & Services; Armor Holdings; Stewart & Stevenson
- Manufacturer: BAE Systems Platforms & Services
- No. built: 1,000+

Specifications
- Mass: 12.600kg
- Length: 7.5m
- Width: 3.1m
- Crew: 10

The Caiman is a mine-resistant ambush-protected vehicle with a V-hull design based on the Family of Medium Tactical Vehicles (FMTV) and Low Signature Armored Cab (LSAC), initially developed by Stewart & Stevenson and now produced by BAE Systems Platforms & Services.

The Caiman is based on the chassis and automotives of the Medium Tactical Vehicle variant of the FMTV and features:

- 10-man crew capacity
- Tensylon composite armor
- Armor enhancement capable
- Accepts all types of manned and remote weapons stations
- 85 percent parts commonality with standard FMTV models (40,000 of which are already fielded)
- Full-time all wheel drive
- Fully automatic transmission
- Electronic Central Tire Inflation System (CTIS)
- Anti-lock braking system (ABS)
- Class V Interactive Electronic Technical Manuals (IETM)

== History ==
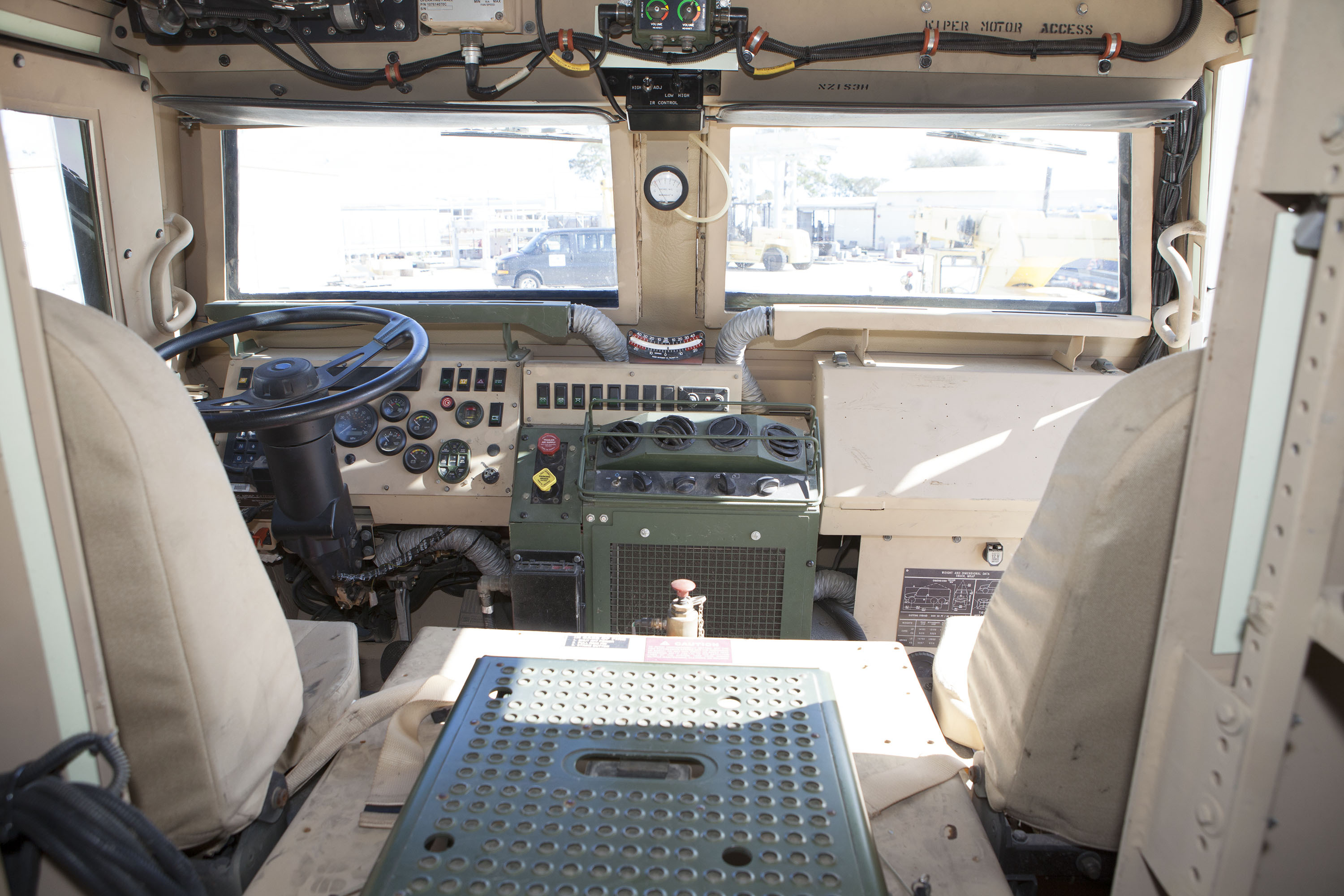
The interior of a Caiman used by NASA

The Caiman completed testing by the U.S. military at the Aberdeen Proving Grounds in July 2007. On July 13, 2007, Armor Holdings received a prime contract award by the U.S. Navy on the behalf of the U.S. Marine Corps for $518.5 million under the MRAP vehicle program. The contract specified delivery of 1,154 Category I MRAP vehicles and 16 Category II MRAP vehicles by the end of February 2008.

BAE Systems acquired Armor Holdings in 2007 and continued production of the Caiman.

In August 2009, the U.S. Army announced that Oshkosh Defense had been awarded the FMTV A1P2 rebuy production contract. This award did not include the Caiman.

In September 2010 BAE Systems was awarded a $629 million contract from the U.S. MRAP Joint Program Office to upgrade 1,700 Caiman MRAP vehicles to Caiman Multi-Terrain Vehicle - Caiman MTV standard. The upgraded vehicle integrates a refurbished and improved armored capsule from an existing vehicle with a new high-power automotive power train, chassis and independent suspension made by ArvinMeritor. Greater survivability is achieved through an enhanced monolithic floor, a strengthened chassis frame and better blast absorbing seats.

On December 18, 2011, a Caiman was part of the last U.S. military convoy out of Iraq, being the last vehicle to cross the border into Kuwait, signifying the end of U.S. military presence and operations in the eight-year Iraq War.

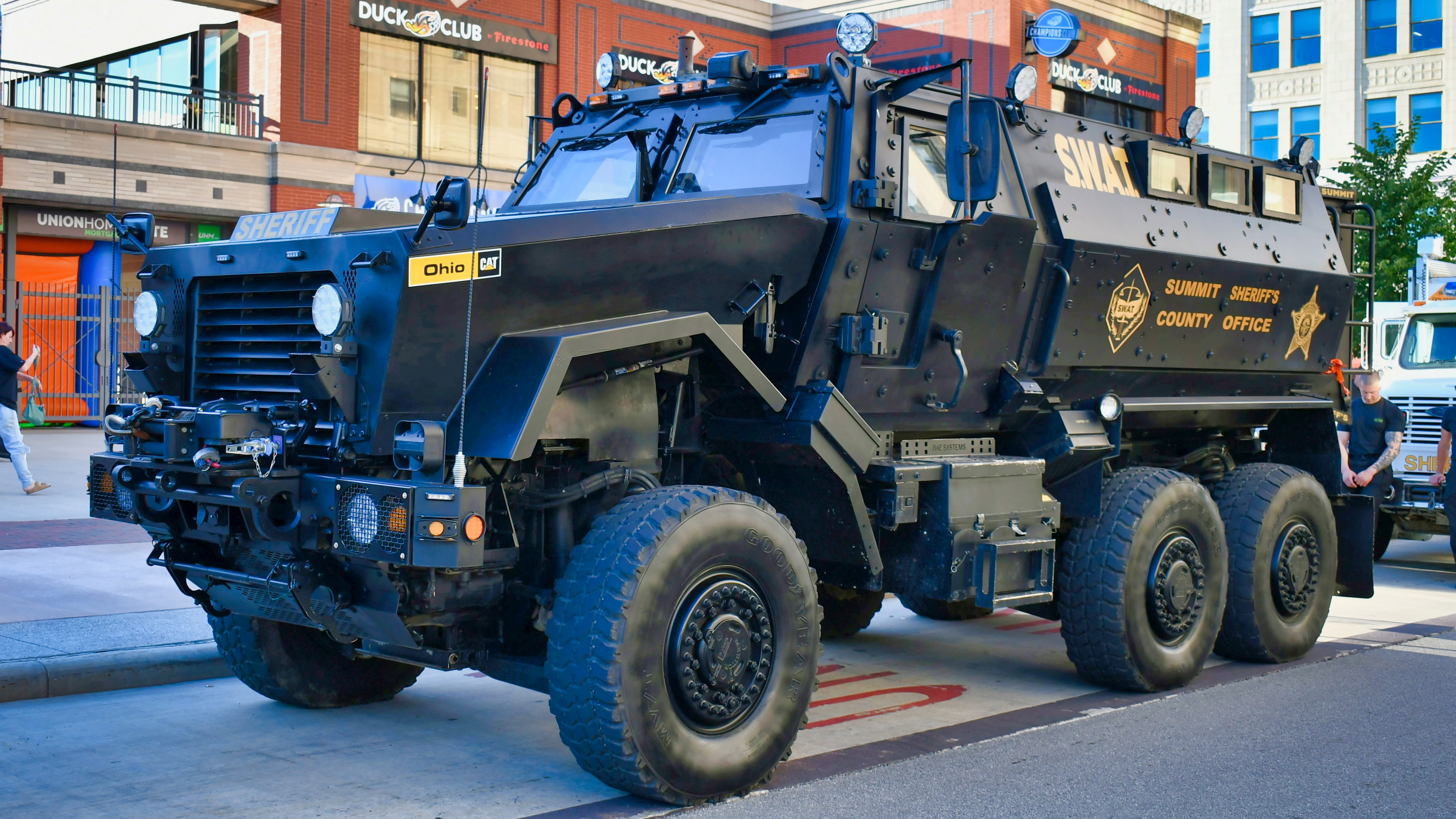
A Caiman used by the Summit County Sheriff's Office in Ohio

Starting in October 2013, local police and sheriff offices in the U.S. began to acquire Caiman 6x6 MTVs. The U.S. government offered these vehicles to local law enforcement as the need for them greatly decreased after the Iraq and Afghanistan wars ended. The Caiman MTV normally costs $412,000, but is sold for only its transportation costs to the local jurisdiction.

In September 2014, the U.S. approved a $2.5 billion deal with the United Arab Emirates Army for over 4,500 surplus U.S. MRAPs for increased force protection, conducting humanitarian assistance operations, and protecting vital international commercial trade routes and critical infrastructure. 1,150 vehicles were Caimans.

== Operators ==
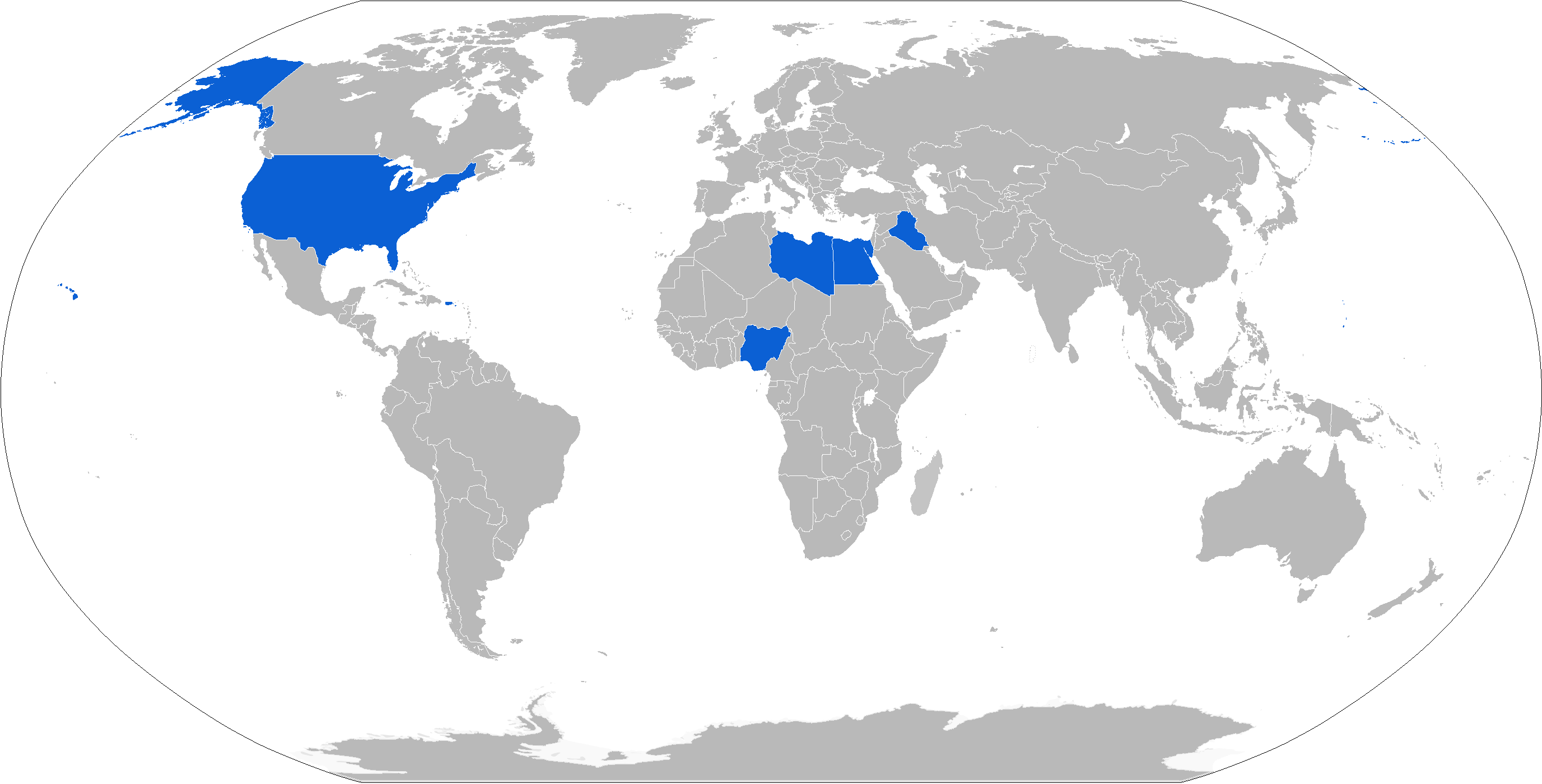
Map with military BAE Caiman operators in blue

=== Military operators ===
- Egypt: Egyptian Armed Forces — 2000
- Iraq: Iraqi Special Operations Forces
  - Kurdistan
- Libya: Libyan National Army
- Nigeria: Nigerian Army — part of a batch of 24 MRAPs
- United Arab Emirates: United Arab Emirates Army — 1,150
- United States
  - United States Army

=== Civilian operators ===
- United States
  - NASA
  - Summit County Sheriff's Office
  - Waterbury, Connecticut Police Department

=== Non-state operators ===
- People's Defense Units (YPG)

== See also ==
- Family of Medium Tactical Vehicles (FMTV)
