= Family of Medium Tactical Vehicles =

Series of US military trucks since 1996

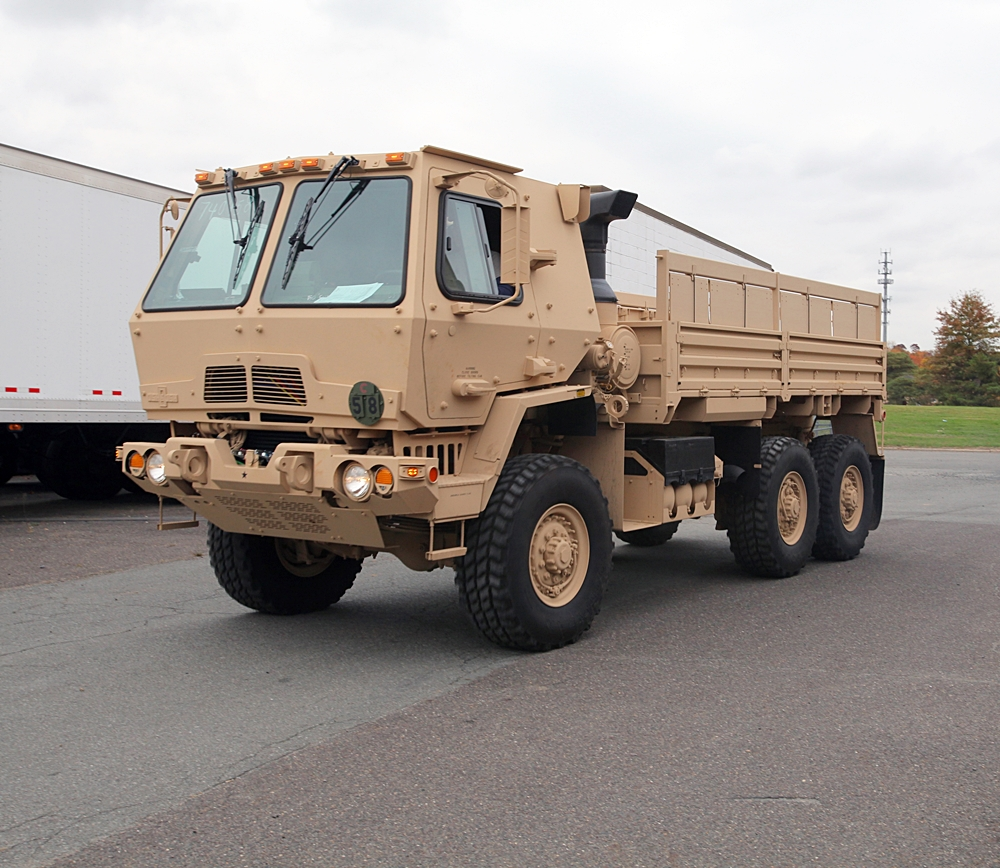
- An Oshkosh-produced M1083 A1P2 5-ton MTV in A-kit configuration
- Type: Family of 4×4 and 6×6 tactical trucks with 2.5-ton, 5-ton, 9-ton and 10-ton payload (U.S. tons)
- Place of origin: United States

Service history
- In service: 1996–present
- Used by: United States Army and others (see Operators)

Production history
- Designer: Steyr of Austria (original); Stewart & Stevenson for FMTV requirement. IP of the FMTV is owned by U.S. government
- Designed: 1988 (for FMTV requirement by Stewart & Stevenson)
- Manufacturer: Stewart & Stevenson (original); Armor Holdings (acquired Stewart & Stevenson); BAE Systems (acquired Armor Holdings); Oshkosh Corporation (current; won rebuy competition)
- Produced: 1982–present
- No. built: BAE Systems and legacy companies – 74,000 trucks and trailers Oshkosh Defense – 40,500 trucks and trailers as of August 2021 (production continues)
- Variants: (full details and National Stock Numbers (NSNs) in main text): M1078 (LMTV Cargo); M1079 (LMTV Van); M1080 (LMTV Chassis (3.9 m)); M1081 (LMTV Cargo-airdrop LVAD); M1082 (LMTV Trailer); M1083 (MTV Cargo); M1084 (MTV Cargo with MHE); M1085 (MTV Long Wheelbase Cargo); M1086 (MTV Long Wheelbase Cargo with MHE); M1087 (MTV Expansible Van); M1088 (MTV Tractor); M1089 (MTV Wrecker); M1090 (MTV Dump); M1091 (MTV 1,500 gallon Fuel Tanker); M1092 (MTV Chassis (4.1 m)); M1093 (MTV Cargo-airdrop LVAD); M1094 (MTV Dump-airdrop LVAD); M1095 (MTV Trailer); M1096 (MTV Long Wheelbase (4.5 m) Chassis); M1140 (HIMARS, launcher chassis); M1147 (Trailer, FMTV Load Handling System); M1148 (Load handling system, 8 metric tonnes); M1157 (10-ton dump); XM1160 (10-ton MEADS air defence chassis (5.5 m wheelbase)); Mongoose Mobile Launcher Chassis (MLC) (cancelled); M1273 (MTV 10-ton chassis)

M1078A1P2 2.5-ton LMTV cargo

Specifications
- Mass: 10,390 kg (22,904 lbs) (curb w/fuel); 2,268 kg (5000 lbs) (payload)
- Length: 6.739 m (22.1 feet)
- Width: 2.438 m (7.99 feet)
- Height: 2.83 m (9.28 feet)
- Crew: 2
- Armor: a-kit/b-kit; U.S. Army Long Term Armor Strategy (LTAS) compliant
- Engine: Caterpillar (CAT) C7, 7.2-liter, 6-cylinder inline water-cooled diesel developing 275 hp (EPA 2007)
- Payload capacity: rated at 2.5 U.S. tons
- Transmission: Allison 3700 SP 7-speed automatic with integral single speed transfer case
- Suspension: Parabolic tapered leaf springs and telescopic shock-absorbers
- Fuel capacity: 212 litres (56 US Gallons)
- Operational range: 483 km (300 miles)
- Maximum speed: 94 km/h (58 mph)
- Steering system: Power-assisted, front axle

M1083A1P2 5-ton MTV cargo

Specifications
- Mass: 11,280 kg (24,870 lbs) (curb w/fuel); 4,535 kg (10,000 lbs) (payload)
- Length: 7.272 m
- Width: 2.438 m
- Height: 2.83 m
- Crew: 2
- Armor: a-kit/b-kit; U.S. Army Long Term Armor Strategy (LTAS) compliant
- Engine: Caterpillar (CAT) C7, 7.2-liter, 6-cylinder inline water-cooled diesel developing 330 hp (EPA 2007)
- Payload capacity: Rated at 5 U.S. tons
- Transmission: Allison 3700 SP 7-speed automatic with integral single speed transfer case
- Suspension: Parabolic tapered leaf springs (inverted on rear bogies), telescopic shock-absorbers and an anti-roll bar on rear bogie
- Fuel capacity: 212 litres
- Operational range: 483 km
- Maximum speed: 94 km/h
- Steering system: Power-assisted, front axle

The Family of Medium Tactical Vehicles (FMTV) are a series of military vehicles based upon a common chassis, varying by payload and mission requirements. The FMTV is derived from the Austrian Steyr 12M18 truck, but substantially modified to meet United States Army requirements. These include a minimum 50 percent U.S. content.

There were originally 17 FMTV variants—four variants in the nominal 2.5 U.S. ton payload class, designated Light Medium Tactical Vehicle (LMTV), and 13 variants with a nominal 5 U.S. ton payload rating, called Medium Tactical Vehicle (MTV).

Since the first FMTVs were fielded in January 1996, the family has been expanded and the overall design enhanced considerably. The FMTV was originally manufactured by Stewart & Stevenson (1996–2006), then by Armor Holdings (2006–2007), next by BAE Systems Platforms & Services. Since 2011 it has been manufactured by Oshkosh Corporation.

== Development and production history ==
The FMTV's origins trace back to a U.S. Army Training and Doctrine Command (TRADOC) requirements document issued in 1983 for a Medium Tactical Truck (MTT), the intended replacement for the in-service 2.5-ton truck. In July 1984, a program to look at a future 5-ton truck procurement to replace in-service 2.5- and 5-ton trucks began. Cost analysis demonstrated that the procurement should be for both 2.5- and 5-ton trucks. In October 1984, the FMTV formally began as a program. The request for proposals (RFP) for FMTV was released in 1988. At this time it was expected that around 120,000 trucks would be ordered, over three five-year contracts.

In October 1988, the United States Army awarded contracts to Stewart & Stevenson, the Tactical Truck Corporation, a 50/50 joint venture between General Motors Military Vehicles and the BMY Wheeled Vehicle Division of the Harsco Corporation, and Teledyne Continental Motors, for 15 prototype vehicles each, to be completed by January 1989. In October 1991 a five-year FMTV contract was awarded to Stewart & Stevenson. The initial contract order total was expected to be 20,000 vehicles. This was reduced to 10,843 vehicles, and valued at US$1.2 billion. Some options were added, raising the total to 11,197 vehicles over seven contract years. In January 1996, the first FMTVs were fielded.

In October 1998, Stewart & Stevenson was awarded the second FMTV contract, for 8,000 trucks and 1,500 companion trailers, for $1.4 billion. Total quantities including options were 11,491 trucks and 2,292 trailers, delivered between September 1999 and October 2004. Trucks were the improved A1 model, with improvements including an uprated engine (1998 EPA compliant) and transmission, and the introduction of ABS braking. In July 2000, the first A1 models were fielded .

In April 2001, Stewart & Stevenson and Oshkosh Truck Corporation were awarded contracts for the Evaluation Phase (Phase 1) of the FMTV A1 Competitive Rebuy (FMTV A1 CR) program for the next FMTV production contract. Following trials and evaluation, in April 2003 the contract was awarded to Stewart & Stevenson. Production of the FMTV A1 CR, designated FMTV A1R, began in Q3 2004. Improvements to A1R models were numerous, and included a new EPA 2004 compliant Caterpillar C7 engine. A total of 21,149 FMTVs and companion trailers were built under the FMTV A1R contract award.

In May 2006, Stewart & Stevenson was acquired by Armor Holdings Inc. In August 2007, Armor Holdings was acquired by BAE Systems.

The United States Army had intended that two variants of the Future Tactical Truck System (FTTS) would eventually replace virtually all of its tactical wheeled vehicle fleet, including the FMTV. The FTTS never materialized. However, along with inputs from other efforts, the FTTS continues to be used to define requirements for future United States Army trucks. With the FTTS already faltering, BAE Systems was awarded a bridging contract in June 2008, for up to 10,000 FMTVs or trailers. The contract including an option for 10,000 additional vehicles, which was exercised.

In May 2009, BAE Systems, Navistar Defense and Oshkosh Defense each submitted proposals for the FMTV A1P2 competitive rebuy program to the U.S. Army's Tank-Automotive and Armaments Command (TACOM) Life Cycle Management Command. In August 2009, the United States Army announced that Oshkosh Defense had been awarded the FMTV A1P2 rebuy production contract. The award was protested by both BAE Systems and Navistar.

The FMTV A1P2 rebuy was awarded as a five-year 'build-to-print' requirements-type award, that at award, allowed the U.S. government to order from 0 up to 12,415 trucks and 10,926 trailers to 2014. Some FMTV variants were excluded from the rebuy competition. Those excluded include specialist FMTV variants such as HIMARS, Patriot, MEADS and LVAD, plus all the armored cabs developed by BAE Systems.

In February 2012, all FMTV work with BAE Systems had concluded, minus a small number of armor B-kits. BAE Systems and legacy companies delivered around 74,000 FMTV trucks and trailers to the United States Army.

In March 2012, U.S. budgetary projections suggested that due to funding constraints, the FMTV program would be terminated in FY14. Under the FMTV contract, orders could be placed until December 2013, with first deliveries to commence within one year of that, with final deliveries one year later. In October 2016, the FMTV contract was extended from September 2016 to August 2019, allowing for the continued procurement of FMTV A1P2s. One day earlier, the U.S. Army solicited proposals for the FMTV A2 rebuy competition.

In January 2017, Israel's Ministry of Defense ordered 200 FMTVs from Oshkosh, in a contract valued at $200 million. Deliveries were expected to start tin 2017 and conclude in mid-2018. The MoD noted that additional orders are likely. At this time Oshkosh confirmed that since deliveries started in 2010, the company had received orders for over 24,500 FMTV trucks and 11,400 FMTV trailers.

On 21 September 2017, the U.S. Army made an administrative modification to the FMTV A1P2 requirements contract with Oshkosh, to establish the eighth, ninth and tenth Order Years' pricing under the contract, at an estimated value of $466 million. This administrative modification authorizes future orders under the FMTV A1P2 contract to August 2019. This contract extension will close out production of the FMTV A1P2.

On 21 September 2017, an order for 1,065 FMTVs at a value of $260.1 million under Order Year 8 of the latest contract extension was announced. On 27 September a further two Order Year 8 orders for a total of 148 FMTVs valued at more than $36 million was announced, with Oshkosh confirming that the company had delivered more than 36,200 FMTV trucks and trailers. In November 2017, Oshkosh announced the delivery of the 25,000th FMTV truck to the US Army. In June 2018, Oshkosh announced that the U.S. Army Contracting Command had placed four additional orders, for a total of 771 FMTV A1P2s, valued at $159.6 million.

In February 2019, the U.S. Army Tank-automotive and Armaments Command (TACOM) Life Cycle Management Command (LCMC) placed orders with Oshkosh for a further 354 FMTV A1P2 trucks and trailers, at a value of $75 million. By February 2019, Oshkosh had delivered more than 38,100 FMTVs since the award of the FMTV A1P2 contract. In June 2019, the US Department of Defence awarded Oshkosh a $320,000,000 modification to domestic and Foreign Military Sales (Argentina, Djibouti, Iraq, Lebanon, Romania) contract, for procurement of Family of Medium Tactical Vehicle variants. The estimated completion date is August 2021.

In August 2021, Oshkosh confirmed that the company had produced over 40,500 A1P2 trucks and trailers.

FMTVs are currently being reset at the Red River Army Depot on return from deployed operations. Current projections are for a recapitalization program to begin in 2020/2021.

== Description ==
The 2.5-ton (4×4) FMTV is designated as the Light Medium Tactical Vehicle (LMTV). The 5-ton (6×6) is designated the Medium Tactical Vehicle (MTV).

The FMTV is based on the Austrian Steyr 12 M 18 (4×4) truck, but has been localized to meet a minimum of 50% US content. The original 15 FMTV prototypes were assembled in Austria. Based on the 12 M 18 chassis-cab, they were fitted with a number of US-supplied/specification components, including a Caterpillar diesel engine, Allison automatic transmission and Meritor drive axles.

In a move away from previous United States Army designs, a cab over engine (COE) design was selected for the FMTV, as while the US Army did not specify this configuration, given the Cold War situation prevailing at the time it had indicated that overall length for shipboard transport was a consideration.

On a model-for-model basis the FMTV is around 3 ft. shorter than its bonneted predecessors, while retaining a C-130 Hercules transport capability. Subject to load dimensions, all original FMTV variants are C-130 transportable at GVWR, and all models capable of being transported underslung by helicopter are fitted with a sliding outrigger system. Low Altitude Parachute Extraction System (LAPES), later revised to Low-Velocity Air Drop (LVAD) variants of A0 production LMTV (M1081 cargo) and MTV (M1093 cargo and M1094 dump) variants were produced.

The chassis and cab of the FMTV feature extensive corrosion protection. It was the first truck to pass the United States Army's 22-year accelerated corrosion test.

The design of the FMTV has never remained static and to further increase reliability, user-friendliness, and operational flexibility, detailed refinements/upgrades have continued throughout FMTVs production run.

The FMTV is built around a conventional bolted / Huck-bolted, (Note: A Huck bolt is a fastener something between a bolt and a rivet. They are installed cold, with a powered tool. The central pin of the fastener is hardened steel, headed and threaded like a bolt. A collar taking the place of a nut is unthreaded and slides over the pin. The insertion tool then grips the tail of the pin and forces a conical nozzle down over the collar, swaging it into close contact with the thread. This gives a strong and vibration-proof fitting which can be stronger than either bolts or rivets of the same diameter.) cold-formed C-section chassis, with bolted-in tubular cross-members. The high-grade 758 MPa steel used is sourced from Sweden. LMTV variants can be fitted with a DP-10J winch with an 11,000 lb. line pull. MTV variants use a DP-515 winch with a 15,500 lbs. line pull.

Current production FMTV A1P2s are powered by a 2007 Environmental Protection Agency (EPA) emissions-compliant 7.2-liter six-cylinder Caterpillar C7 diesel engine, producing 275 hp and 860 Lb.-Ft. torque in LMTV variants and 330 hp and 860 Lb-Ft.torque in MTV variants. FMTV A1Rs have a 2004 EPA emissions compliant version of the same engine with the same power output.

FMTV A1 variants have an earlier 1998 EPA emissions-compliant version of this engine, the 3126 ATAAC, which produced 275 hp at 2,400 rpm and 815 Lb.-Ft.torque at 1,600 rpm in LMTV variants, and 330 hp and 850 Lb.-Ft.torque in MTV variants. A 6.6-liter derivative of this engine, the 3116 ATAAC, was fitted to FMTV A0 models where it produced 225 hp and 735 Lb.-Ft. torque in LMTV variants, and 290 hp at 2,600 rpm and 860 Lb.-Ft. torque in MTV variants.

The Allison 3070 SP seven-speed transmission fitted to A1P2 and A1R FMTVs evolved with the FMTV, its A1 designation being MD 3070 PT, its A0 designation being MD-D7. This has an integral single-speed transfer case. All-wheel drive is full-time, with a 30/70 percent front/rear torque split for on-road driving, and a 50/50 percent split for off-road driving.

All FMTV models are fitted with Meritor beam axles, with ratings and specifications evolving as the FMTV has developed. Suspension is by a combination of parabolic tapered leaf springs, inverted on the MTV rear bogie, shock absorbers, and an anti-roll bar for the rear axle/bogie.

Two cargo trailers are part of the Family of Medium Tactical Vehicles (FMTV). The M1082 single-axle trailer is used with the LMTV cargo truck. The M1095 twin-axle trailer is used with the MTV cargo truck. Both trailers have payloads that match that of the towing truck, and they share many components, including axles, with the towing truck.

== Variants ==
(sequenced by U.S. Army M number)

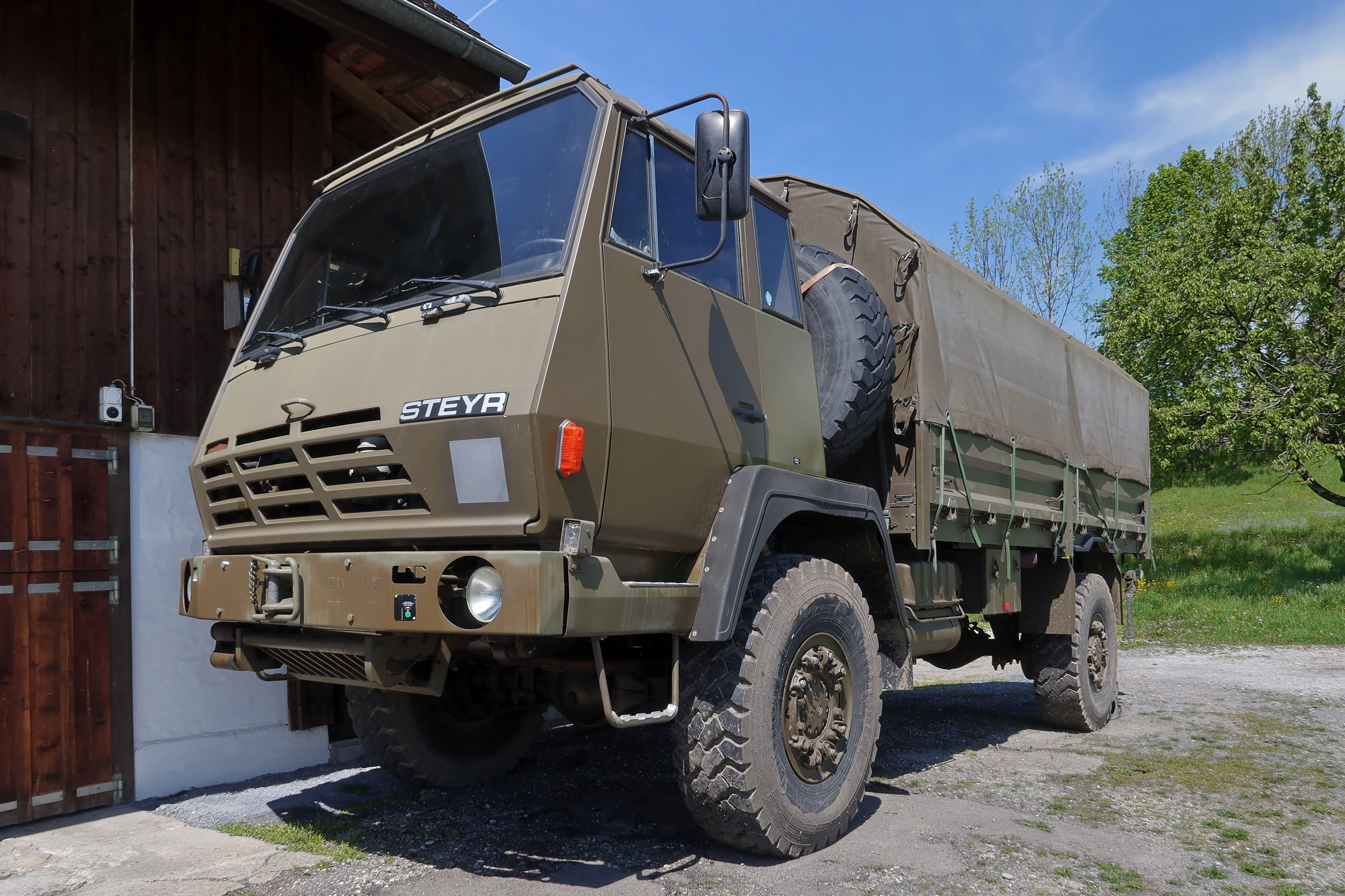
An ex-Swiss military Steyr 1291

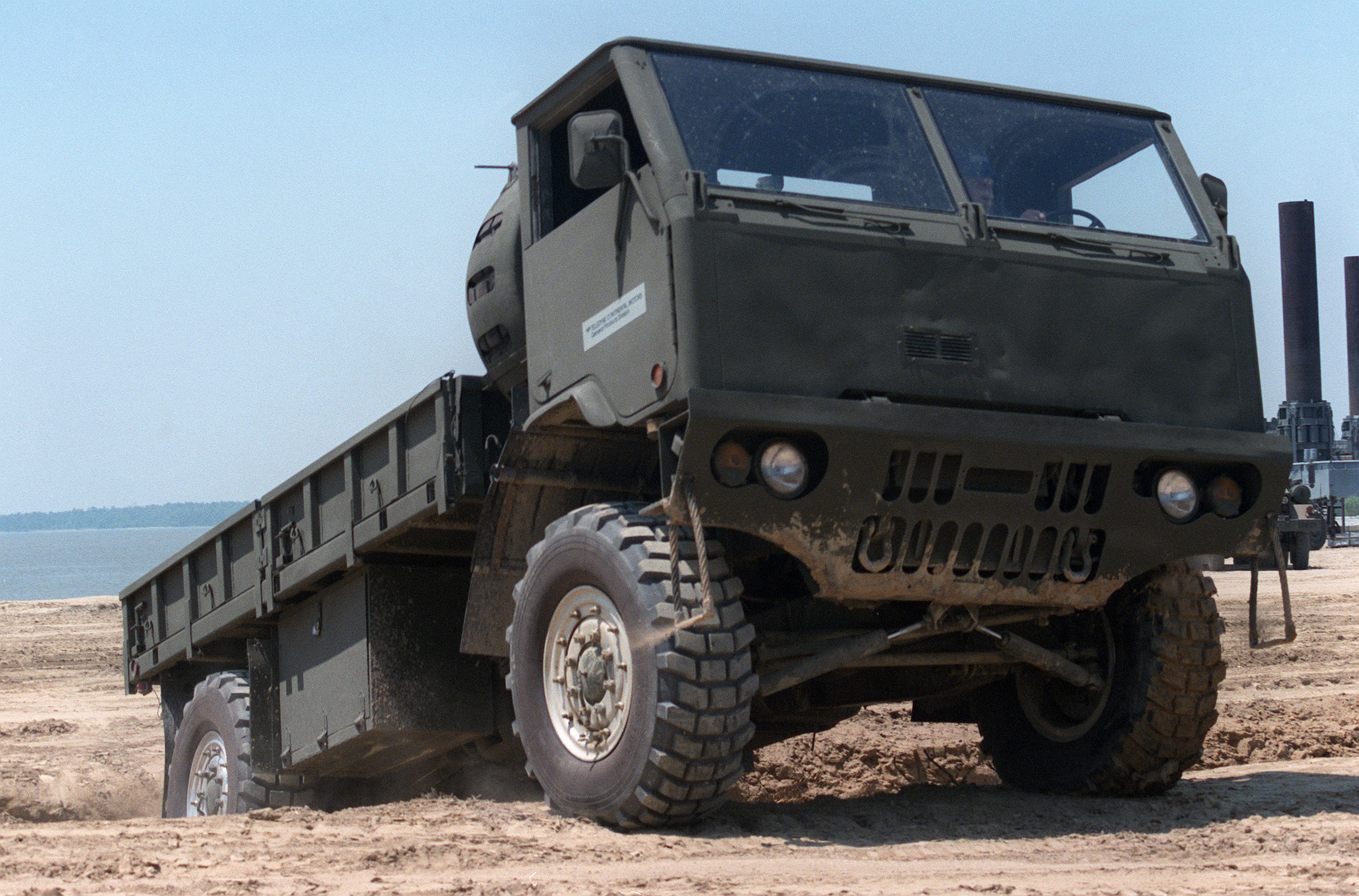
A prototype "Medium tactical vehicle" at the PROLOG '85 US Army logistics exhibition

- M1078 A0/A1/A1R/A1P2 – LMTV Cargo NSN 2320-01-549-8577
- M1078 A0/A1/A1R/A1P2 – LMTV Cargo with winch NSN 2320-01-549-8611
- M1079 A0/A1/A1R/A1P2 – LMTV Van NSN 2320-01-552-7745
- M1079 A0/A1/A1R/A1P2 – LMTV Van with winch NSN 2320-01-552-7749
- M1080 A0/A1/A1R/A1P2 – LMTV Chassis 3.9 m NSN 2320-01-552-7791
- M1081 A0 – LMTV Cargo-airdrop LVAD
- M1082 A1/A1R/A1P2 – Trailer, LMTV cargo NSN 2320-01-449-1775
- M1083 A0/A1/A1R/A1P2 – MTV Cargo NSN 2320-01-549-8610
- M1083 A0/A1/A1R/A1P2 – MTV Cargo with winch NSN 2320-01-549-8565
- M1084 A0/A1/A1R/A1P2 – MTV Cargo with material handling equipment (MHE) NSN 2320-01-552-7739
- M1084 A0/A1/A1R/A1P2/RSV – MTV Cargo with MHE (HIMARS RSV) NSN 2320-01-552-7767
- M1085 A0/A1/A1R/A1P2 – MTV Cargo, Long Wheelbase Cargo (LWB) NSN 2320-01-552-7773
- M1085 A0/A1/A1R/A1P2 – MTV LWB Cargo with winch NSN 2320-01-552-7770
- M1085 A0/A1/A1R/A1P2 – MTV LWB Cargo w/ Sideboard Delete NSN 2320-01-552-7770
- M1086 A0/A1/A1R/A1P2 – MTV LWB Cargo with MHE NSN 2320-01-552-7780
- M1086 A0/A1/A1R/A1P2 – MTV LWB Cargo with MHE & winch NSN 2320-01-552-7776
- M1087 A1R/A1P2 – MTV Expansible Van NSN 2320-01-552-7781
- M1088 A0/A1/A1R/A1P2 – MTV Tractor NSN 2320-01-552-7759
- M1088 A0/A1/A1R/A1P2 – MTV Tractor with winch NSN 2320-01-552-7759
- M1089 A0/A1/A1R/A1P2 – MTV Wrecker Oshkosh-produced M1089 have different recovery equipment NSN 2320-01-595-3994
- M1090 A0/A1 – MTV Dump
- M1091 – MTV 1,500 gallon Fuel Tanker Type Classified but did not enter production
- M1092 A0/A1/A1R/A1P2 – MTV Chassis 4.1 m NSN 2320-01-552-7793
- M1093 A0 – MTV Cargo-airdrop LVAD
- M1094 A0 – MTV Dump-airdrop LVAD
- M1095 A1/A1R/A1P2 – Trailer, MTV Cargo NSN 2320-01-449-1776
- M1096 A0/A1/A1R/A1P2 – MTV LWB Chassis 4.5 m NSN 2320-01-552-7796
- M1140 A1/A1R HIMARS High Mobility Artillery Rocket System, launcher chassis
- M1147 LHS (palletized) Load Handling System Trailer NSN 2320-01-508-7887
- M1148 A1R/A1P2 LHS (palletized) Load Handling System Truck, eight metric tonnes / 8.8-ton NSN 2320-01-557-4546
- M1157 A1R/A1P2 10-ton Dump NSN 2320-01-552-7787
- M1157 A1R/A1P2 10-ton Dump with winch NSN 2320-01-552-7782
- XM1160 10-ton MEADS air defense chassis (5.5 m wheelbase )
- Mongoose Mobile Launcher Chassis (MLC) (cancelled)
- M1273 A1P2 MTV 10-ton chassis NSN 2320-01-621-6239

MHE: material handling equipment
RSV: re-supply vehicle
LHS: load handling system
LWB: long wheelbase

== Armored cabs and fully armored derivatives ==
Current and recent operational scenarios call for logistic trucks of the FMTV type to have at least the option of cab armoring. When it entered production, armoring was not considered an option for the FMTV. The first protection solution for the FMTV was not in answer to such scenarios, but was developed by Stewart & Stevenson and O'Gara-Hess & Eisenhardt Armoring Company (OHE). Called the Crew Protected Cab, it was specifically for the HIMARS variant and offered flash and Foreign Object Debris (FOD) protection during launch. Designs followed for an Enhanced Crew Protected Cab, and later an Armor Protected Cab, each adding more ballistic capability against direct fire, artillery burst and mines.

To meet emerging threats on deployed operations, in March 2004 DRS Technical Services was awarded a $16.3 million contract to provide 272 armor protection kits for the FMTV. 1,862 kits were produced. These kits were based around ballistic-protection panels installed on standard FMTV cabs.

In answer to demands for greater crew protection, BAE Systems developed the Low Signature Armored Cab (LSAC) for all variants of the FMTV. The LSAC replaced the standard FMTV cab, with which it shares internals, in a remove and replace operation.

To meet the US Army's current Long Term Armor Strategy (LTAS) for armored cabs, BAE Systems developed the LTAS cab for the FMTV. BAE Systems produced over 9,000 LTAS cabs for the FMTV A1P2 variant. All Oshkosh FMTV vehicles include the company's own LTAS-compliant armor solution.

The LTAS is based around the A and B kit principles, allowing for vehicles to be armored as required, with the add-on applique package adaptable to prevailing threats and upgradeable as new armoring technologies emerge. The A-Kit, which includes a new cab, modifies the FMTV to allow the addition of armour. The B-Kit is the bulk of the armor itself.

The Caiman Mine Resistant Ambush Protected (MRAP) vehicle is based on the MTV A1R platform. The United States Marines placed an initial order with the then Armor Holdings for 1,170 Caiman in July 2007. 2,868 Caiman were ordered, with deliveries completed in November 2008. In winter 2010, BAE Systems unveiled the Caiman MultiTerrain Vehicle (MTV) at AUSA. The Caiman MTV is a modified version of the base Caiman, that features a revised driveline, a new chassis and upgraded fully independent suspension.

BAE Systems received contracts to upgrade 2,071 (1,700 + 371) Caiman to Caiman MTV standard. These upgrades were completed in Q1/Q2 2014. Post-Afghanistan, no Caiman MRAPs have been retained by U.S. armed forces. Some have been transferred to U.S. law enforcement agencies. Others have been offered as Excess Defense Articles (EDA) to Iraq, Jordan, Nigeria and the United Arab Emirates (UAE).

In 2008, BAE Systems unveiled the Caiman Light (CLT), a five-man 4×4 version of the Caiman. To meet the Iraqi Light Armored Vehicle Requirement (ILAV), BAE Systems offered a fully armored LMTV on which the LSAC cab was extended rearwards, into a troop carrying body. Neither of these proposals entered production.

== Prototype and developmental FMTVs ==
- Working with Multidrive an LMTV was integrated with a powered companion trailer to produce a C-130 Hercules transportable vehicle with a 15,000 kg payload.
- The FMTV Hybrid Hydraulic Vehicle (HHV) was selected as the test platform for the development of a hybrid hydraulic propulsion system.
- The FMTV was selected as the platform to demonstrate that a 155 mm M777 howitzer and prime mover could, for the first time, be deployed in the same C-130 aircraft.
- Stewart & Stevenson produced five hybrid electric FMTVs, each tailored for a specific application.
- Stewart & Stevenson developed an 11-ton FMTV A1 demonstrator to demonstrate the growth potential of the FMTV family and C4ISR integration potential, via technology insertions, while retaining maximum commonality with the current FMTV fleet. A second vehicle with a tilt-type loadbed was also developed as part of the aborted Future Tactical Truck System (FTTS) requirement. A 13-ton demonstrator then followed.
- Stewart & Stevenson developed a 13-ton Medium Tactical Truck Demonstrator (MTTD) that incorporated many of the technologies and capabilities that the Army then envisioned for its future trucks.
- A number of 8×8 FMTVs have also been developed, these including examples for Australia's Land 121 (awarded to Rheinmetall MAN Military Vehicles (RMMV)), a 13-ton demonstrator with a load handling system, and a pair of chassis as part of the Future Tactical Truck System (FTTS) undertaking.
- Oshkosh Corporation unveiled the FMTV Enhanced Protection & Mobility Demonstrator (EPMD) during 2012. The FMTV EPMD is fitted with Oshkosh's TAK-4 independent suspension system and a custom-fitted Oshkosh Underbody Improvement Kit (UIK).
- To help inform the U.S. Army's FMTV A2 acquisition strategy and performance upgrade requirements Nevada Automotive Test Center was awarded a contract in 2014 to manufacture and test two FMTV Technology Demonstrators. These are based on government-supplied M1157 A1P2 10-ton Dump chassis produced by Oshkosh, but upgraded by NATC. Testing concluded in February 2016.

== FMTV A2 ==
Early in 2014, the U.S. Army's Program Executive Officer for Combat Support and Combat Service Support (CS CSS) suggested that the Army would be seeking a new medium truck family in the mid-2020s. In October 2016 the U.S. Army solicited proposals for the FMTV A2 rebuy competition.

The FMTV A2 request for proposals (RfP) stated the program would seek "to integrate higher capacity suspension, wheels, and tires; integrate underbody protection; increase engine power; integrate higher capacity alternator; integrate data bus upgrade; and integrate safety enhancements". The winner of the contract would be asked to integrate such upgrades; build the vehicles, trailers, and kits; and provide program, maintenance, and logistics support. According to the RfP, the FMTV A2 contract is expected to cover five ordering years with two additional one-year option periods for a potential total of 2,400 vehicles if all options are exercise.

In a subsequent statement, an Army spokesman said the RfP "includes an estimated quantity of approximately 2,400 new production vehicles. However, the actual quantities in any future award are undetermined and will depend on proposed pricing for this quantity, army requirements, and available funding."

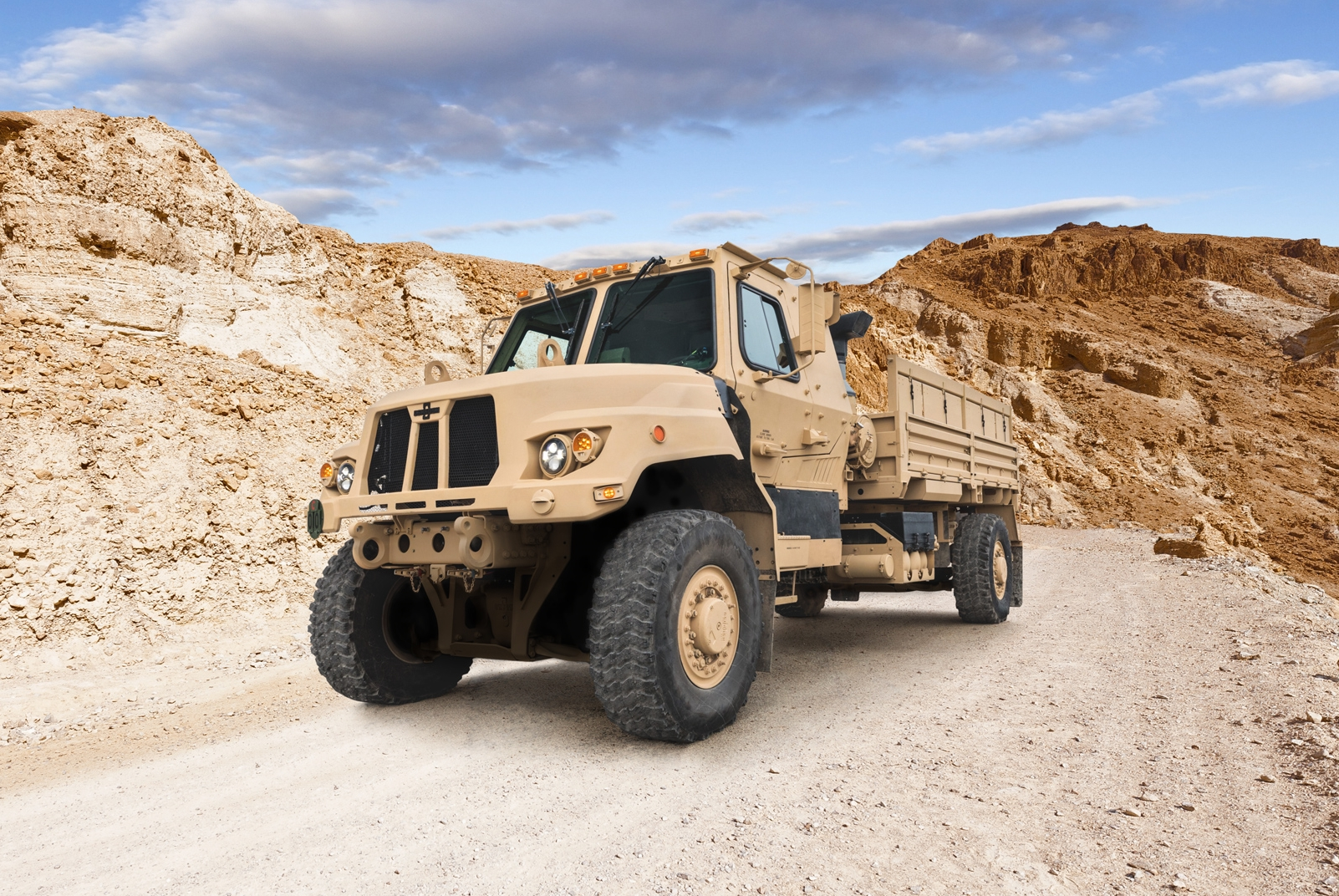
Oshkosh will build A2 FMTVs.

In May 2017, Oshkosh submitted a proposal in response to the RfP for the Family of Medium Tactical Vehicles (FMTV) A2 production effort. At this point, the U.S. Army anticipated a contract award announcement in the second quarter of fiscal year 2018 and stated that the next generation FMTV A2 would comprise 16 models and three trailers.

In February 2018, the Army selected Oshkosh to build to FMTV A2. The initial estimated contract value is $476.2 million, with no cap on the number of vehicles the Army may purchase. The firm fixed price contract covers a five-year ordering period, plus two additional one-year options. The estimated date of completion has previously been quoted as February 2022. Both Oshkosh and AM General submitted bids for the requirement.

Following the FMTV A2 award, Oshkosh initially built and delivered vehicles in support of Production Verification Testing (PVT), Live Fire Testing (LFT) and logistics development. In August 2021, it was announced by Oshkosh that the Army's Tank-Automotive and Armaments Command (TACOM) Life Cycle Management Command (LCMC) had awarded the company a $152 million delivery order for 541 FMTV A2. The Army is expected to begin fielding the A2 FMTV variant in June 2023.

FMTV A2 variants are:

- M1078A2 LMTV cargo, CARGO
- M1079A2 LMTV Van TRUCK, VAN
- M1080A2 LMTV Chassis CHASSIS, TRUCK
- M1082 Trailer TRAILER, Cargo, LMTV
- M1083A2 MTV Cargo TRUCK, CARGO
- M1084A2 MTV Cargo with MHE TRUCK, CARGO
- M1085A2 MTV Cargo LWB TRUCK, CARGO
- M1086A2 MTV LWB Cargo with MHE TRUCK,
- M1087A2 MTV Expansible Van TRUCK, VAN
- M1088A2 MTV Tractor TRUCK TRACTOR
- M1089A2 MTV Wrecker TRUCK, WRECKER
- M1092A2 MTV Chassis CHASSIS, TRUCK
- M1095 Trailer TRAILER, Cargo, MTV XXXX-XX-
- M1096A2 MTV LWB Chassis CHASSIS, TRUCK
- M1147 Trailer, LHST TRAILER, FMTV Load Handling
- M1148A2 LHS Truck TRUCK, MATERIALS HANDLING CONTAINER HOISTING
- M1157A2 10 Ton Dump TRUCK, DUMP XXXX-
- M1157A2 10 Ton Dump with winch TRUCK, DUMP
- M1273A2 10 Ton Dump Chassis CHASSIS,

== Gallery ==
(Production FMTVs are presented in U.S. Army M number sequence)

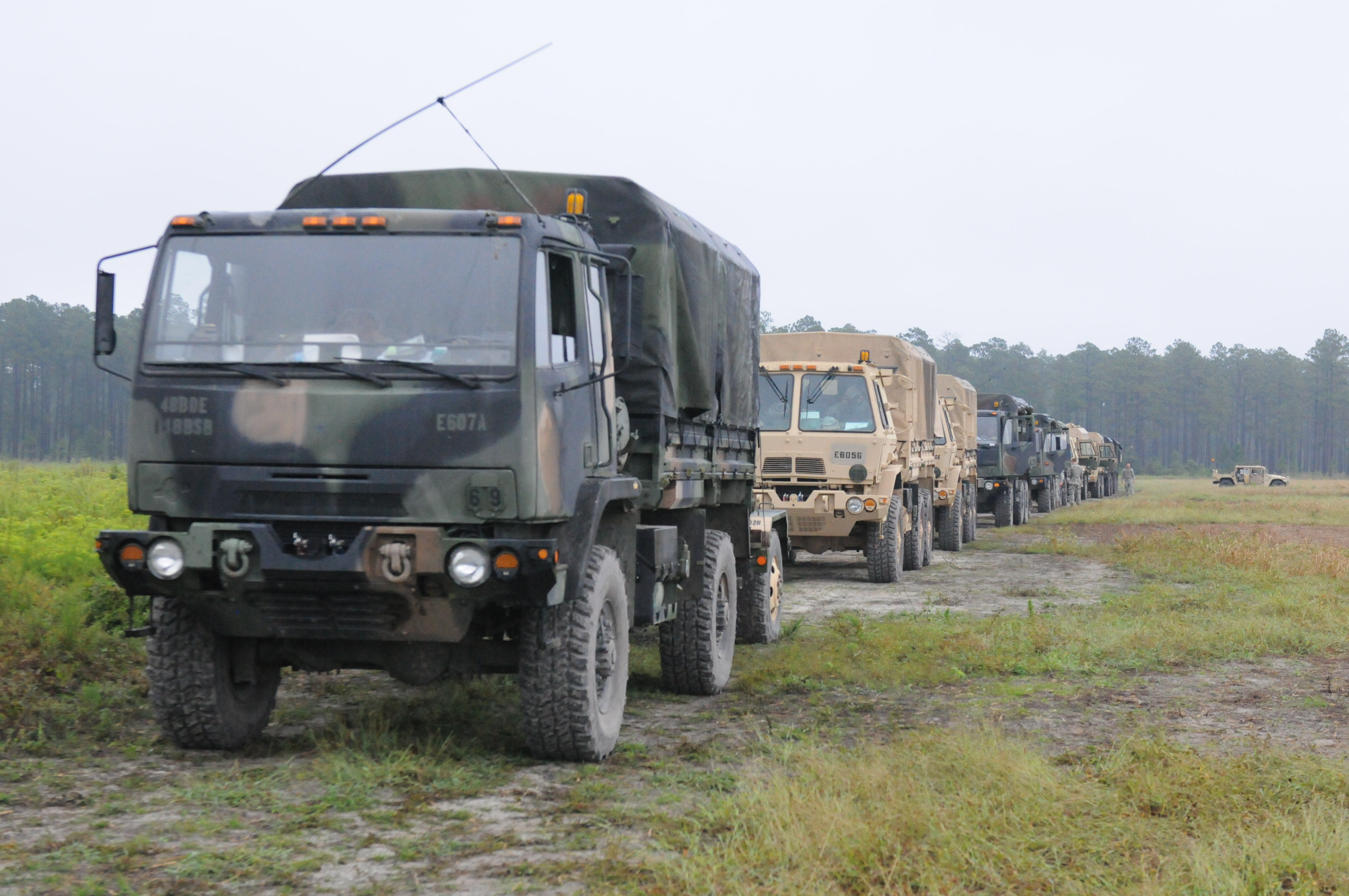
A M1078 A1R (front), with an Oshkosh-produced M1083 A1P2 in A-kit configuration immediately behind

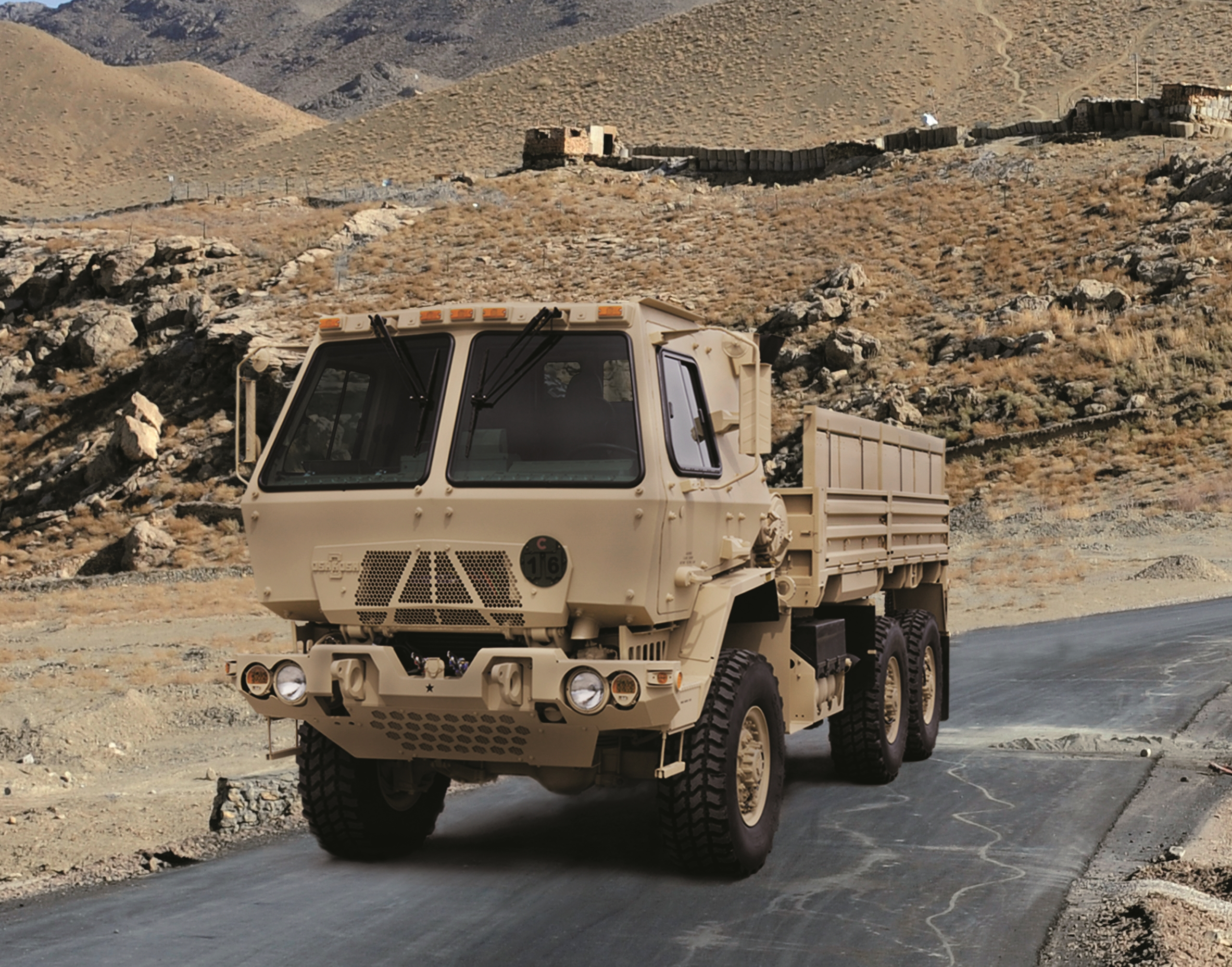
An Oshkosh-produced M1083 A1P2 5-ton MTV cargo in A-kit configuration

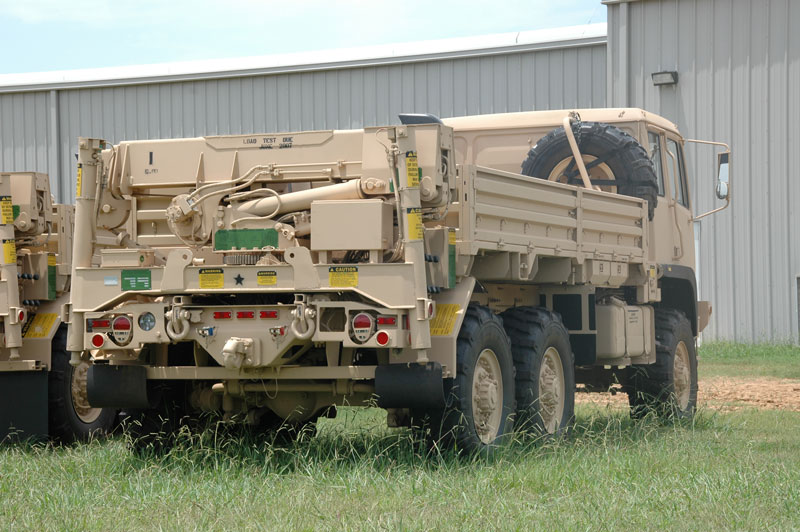
At the Sealy, Texas production facility, a Stewart & Stevenson produced M1084 A1R MTV Cargo with Crane

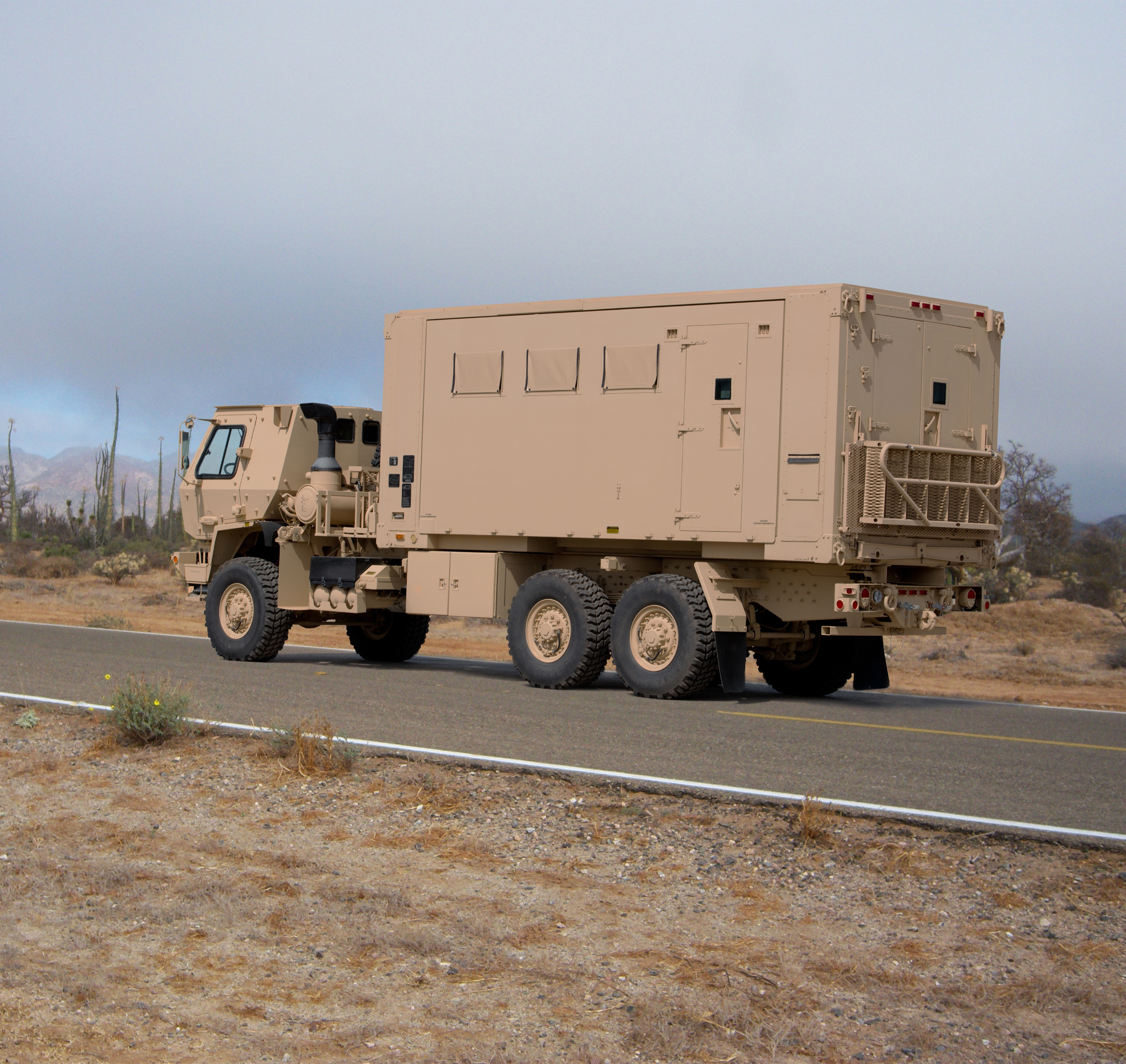
An Oshkosh-produced M1087 A1R MTV Expansible Van in A-kit configuration

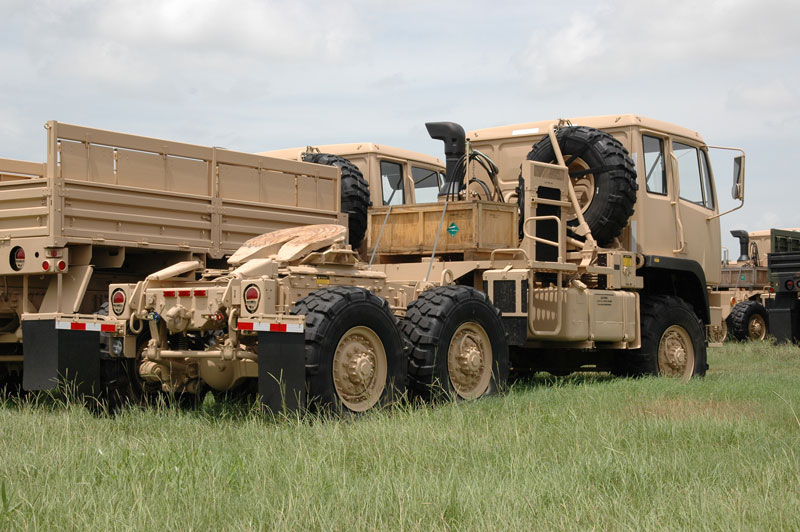
At the Sealy Texas production facility, a Stewart & Stevenson produced M1088 A1R MTV Tractor Truck

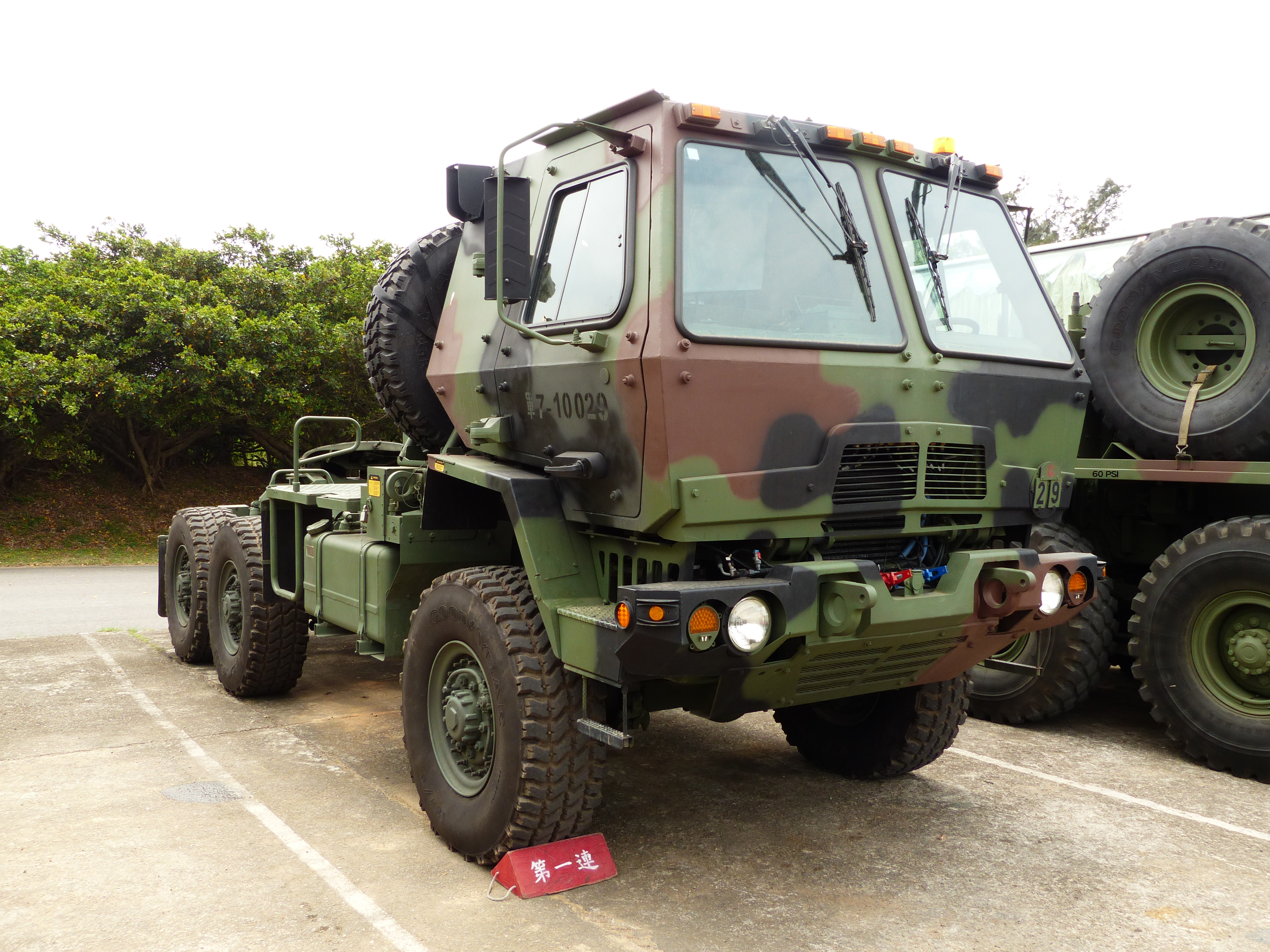
A Republic of China (Taiwan) army BAE Systems-produced M1088 FMTV tractor truck in the car park of Hukou Camp

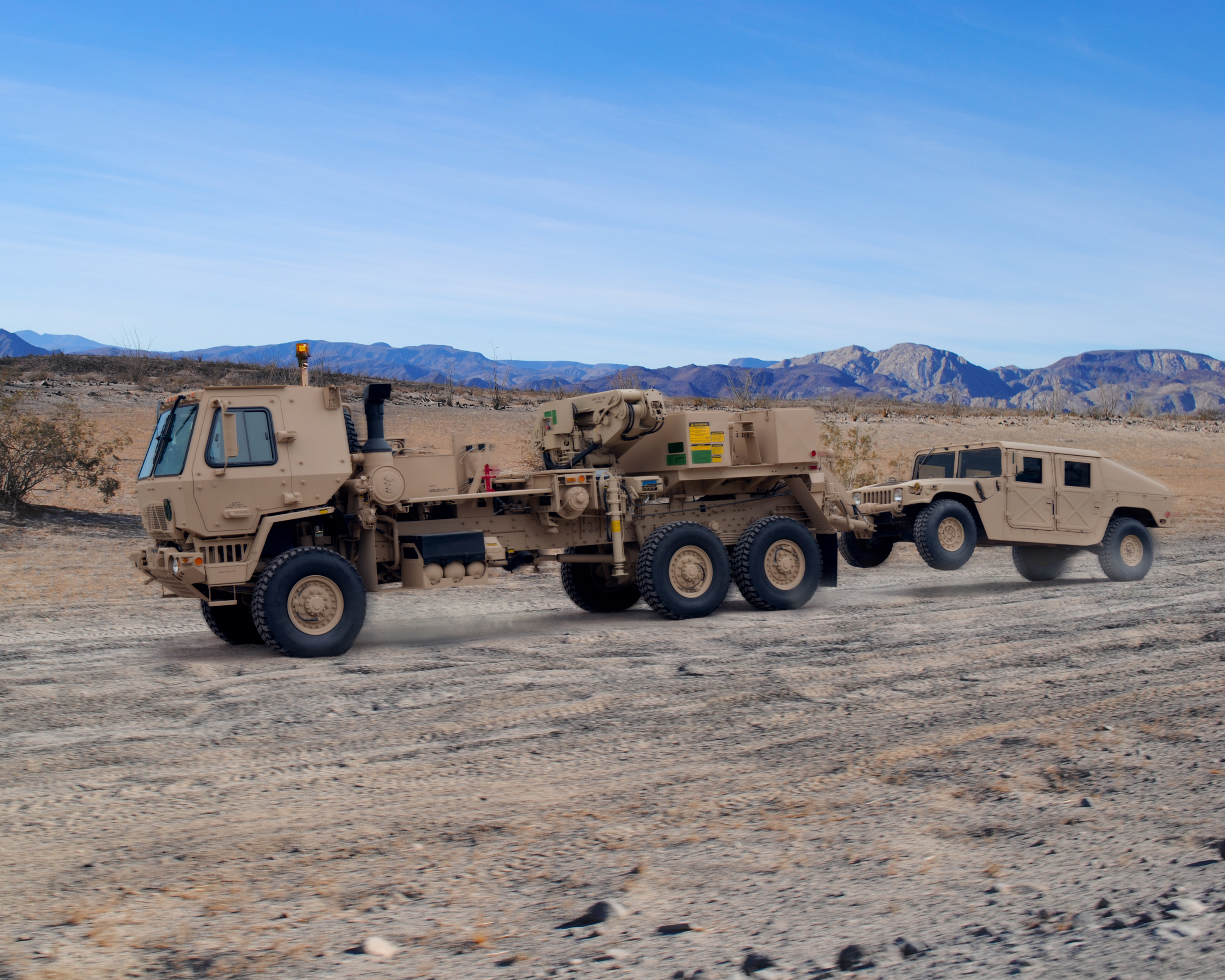
An Oshkosh-produced M1089 A1P2 MTV wrecker in A-kit configuration

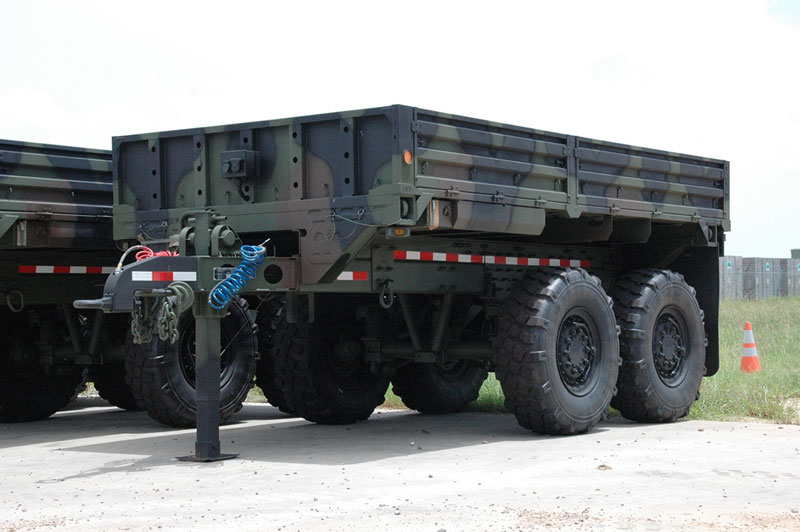
At Stewart & Stevenson's Sealy Texas production facility, a M1095 A1R MTV trailer

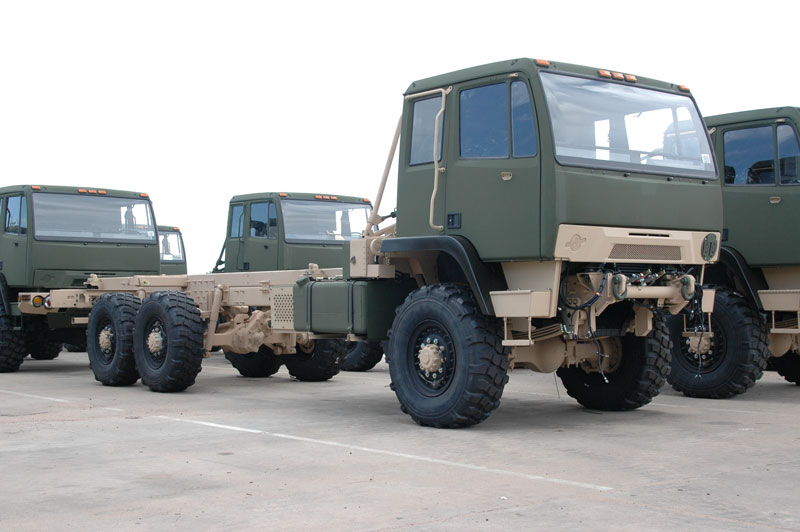
At Stewart & Stevenson's Sealy Texas production facility, a M1096 A1R MTV Long Wheelbase (4.5 m) Chassis

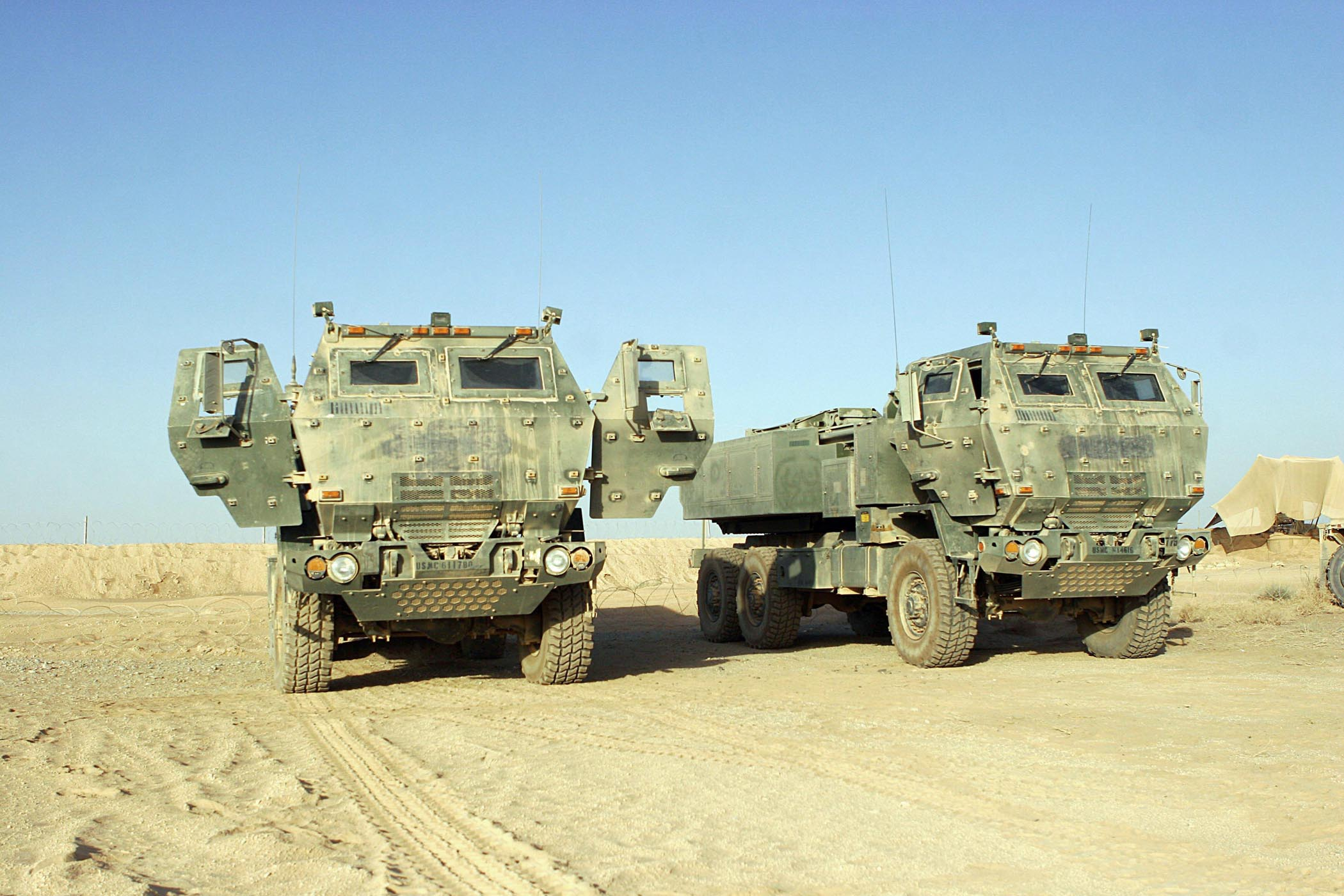
Two Lockheed Martin/BAE Systems M1140 High Mobility Artillery Rocket System (HIMARS) of the U.S. Marines

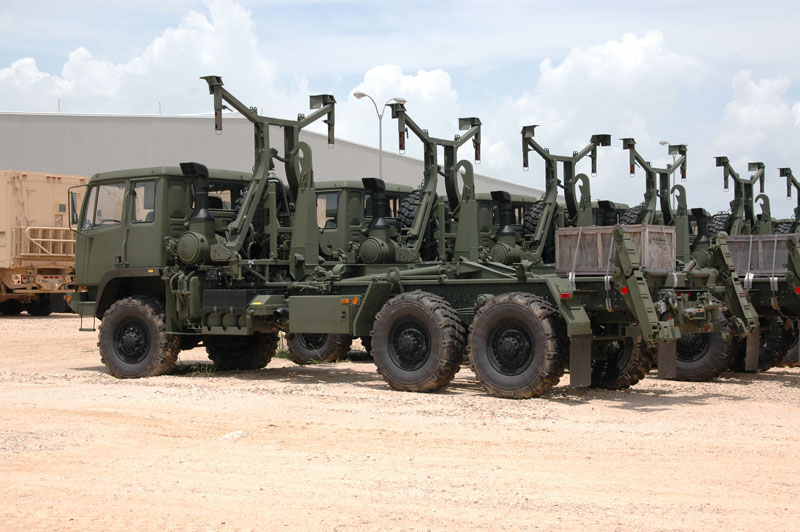
Stewart & Stevenson produced M1148 A1R MTV LHS

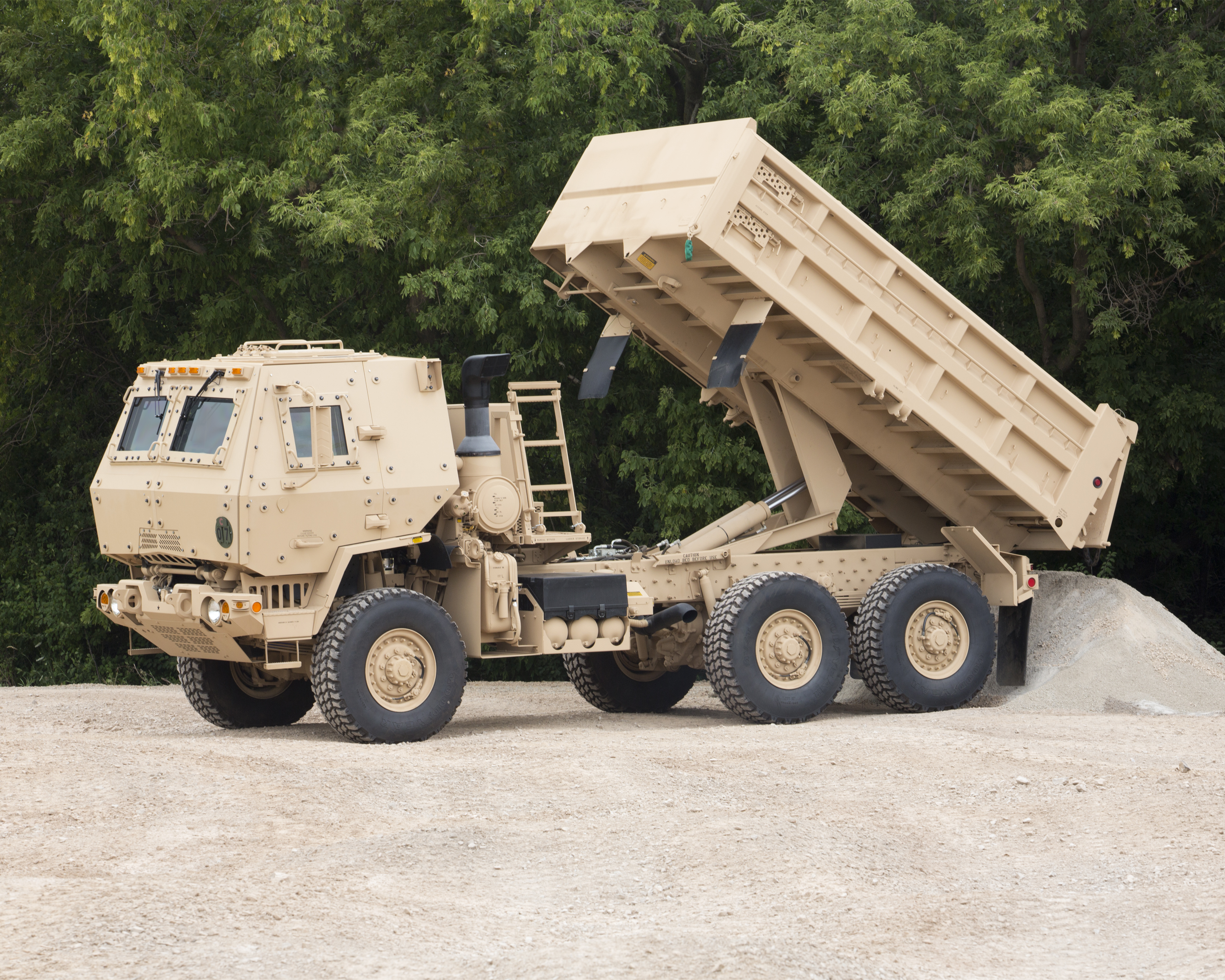
An Oshkosh-produced M1157 A1P2 MTV 10-ton Dump in B-kit configuration

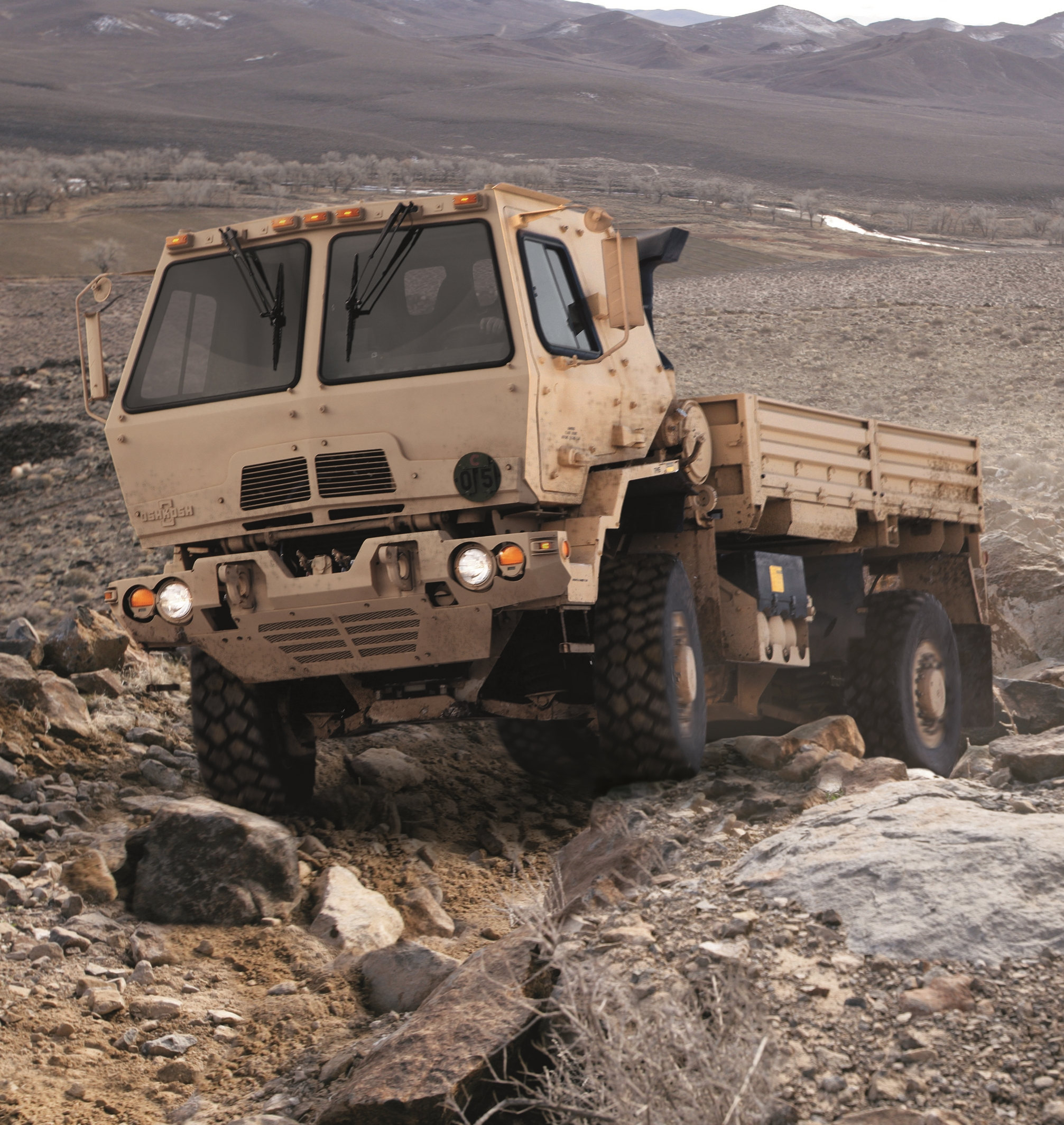
Oshkosh's M1087 A1P2 LTV-based Enhanced Protection & Mobility Demonstrator (EPMD)

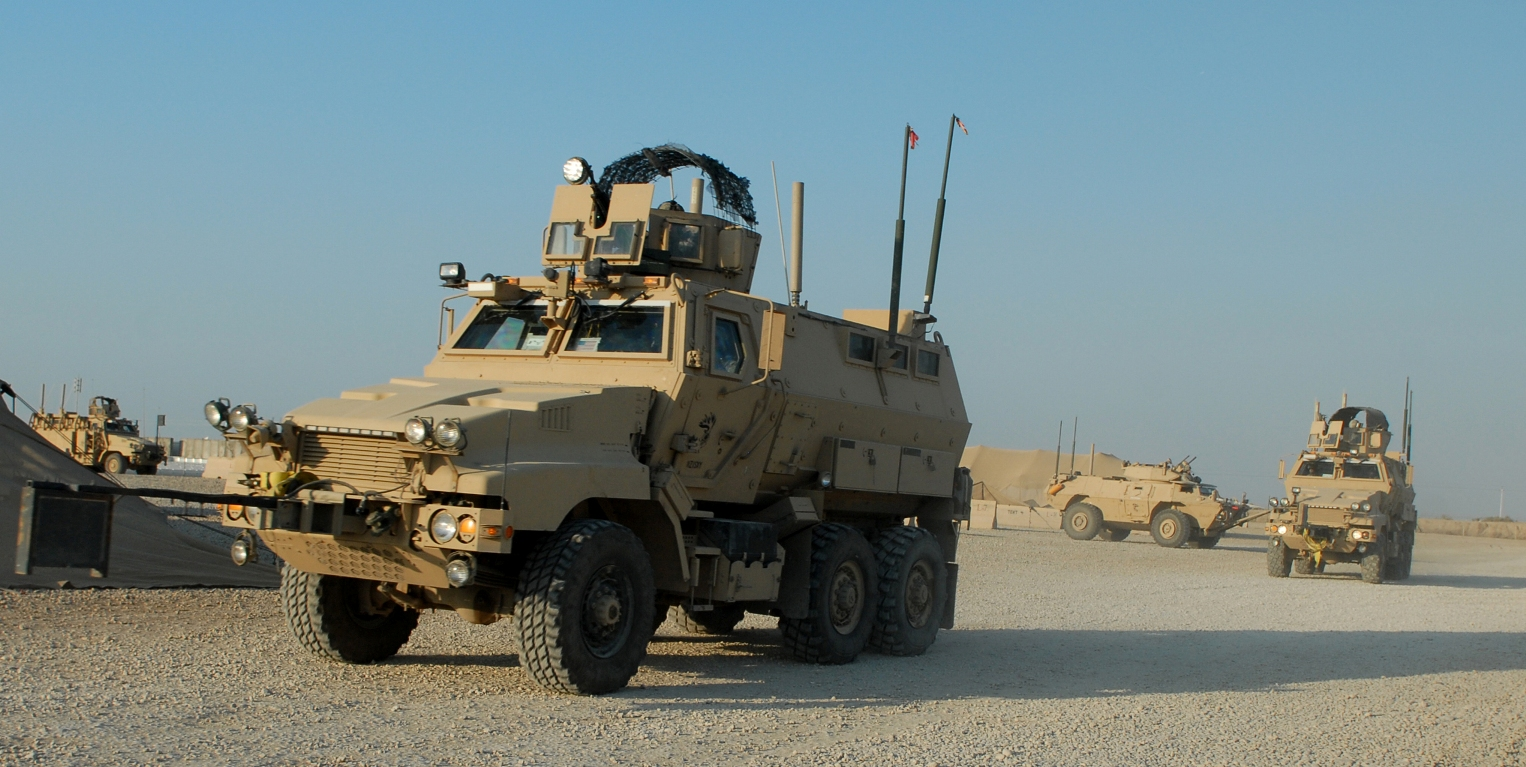
BAE Systems Caiman Mine-Resistant Ambush Protected (MRAP) vehicles in Iraq (Caiman is based on the FMTV)

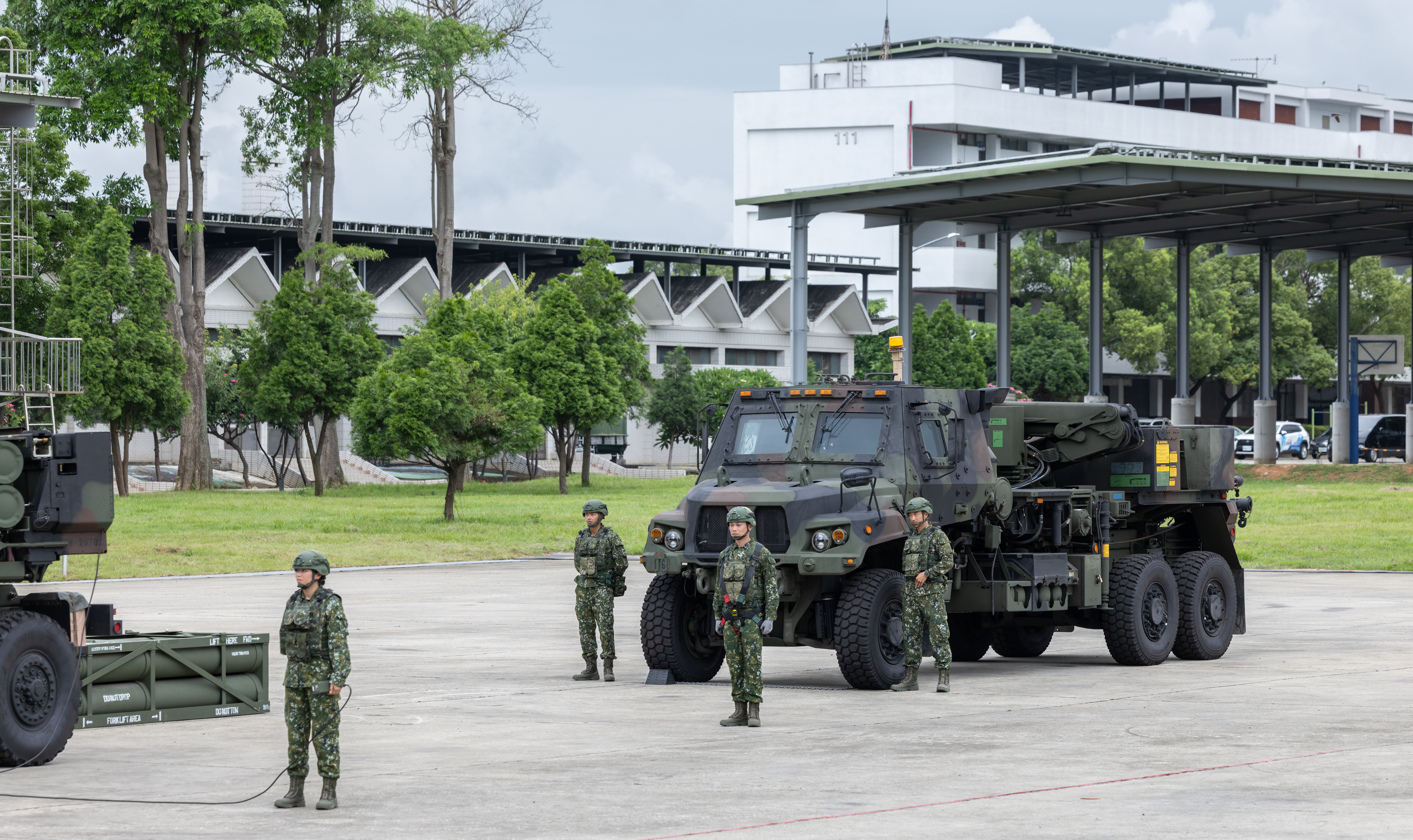
Republic of China (Taiwan) army FMTV M1089A2 Recovery Vehicle.

== Operators ==
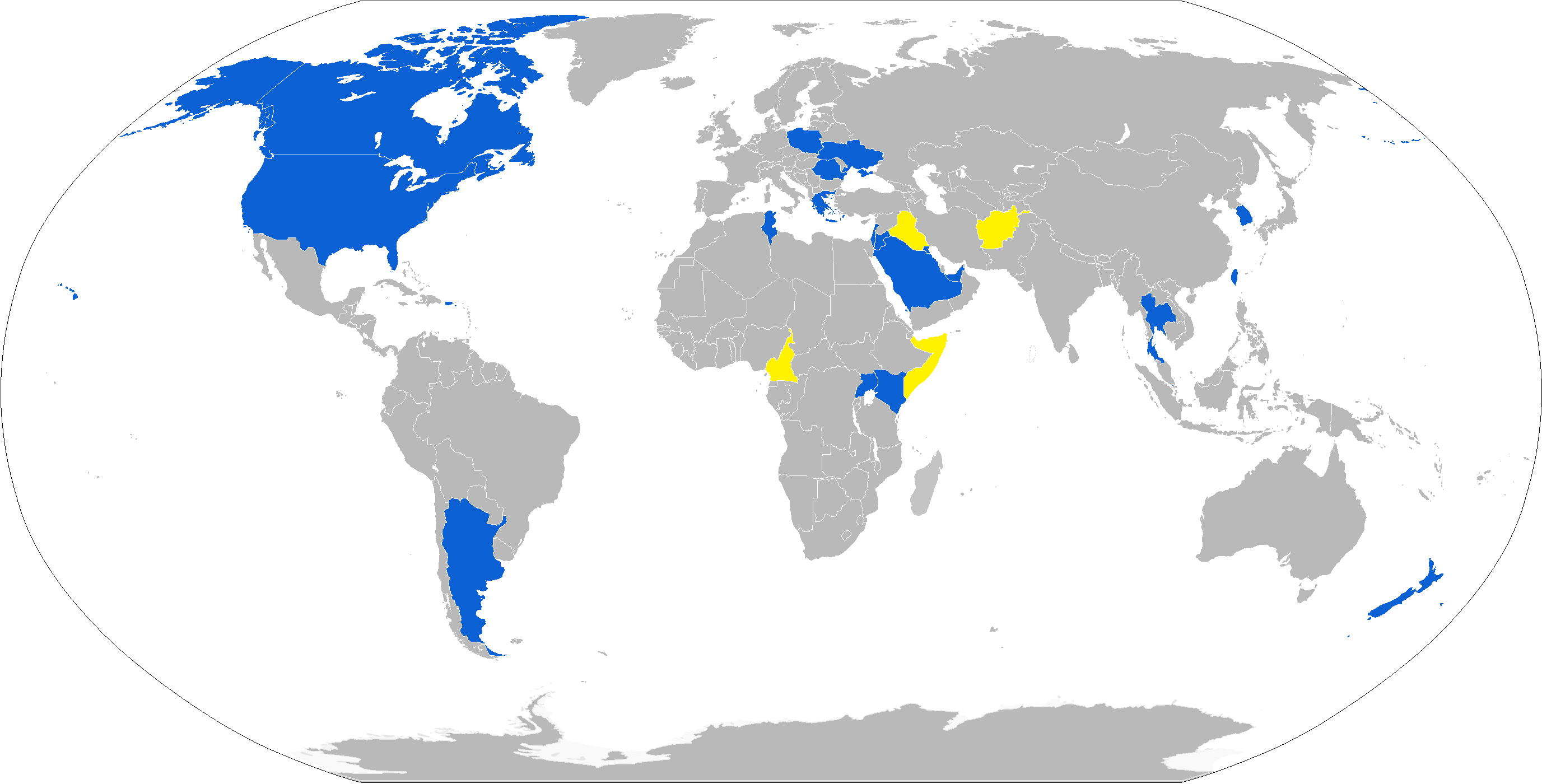
A map with FMTV operators in blue, unconfirmed quantity in yellow.

Specific details of FMTV export orders are seldom officially announced, with a large quantity of deliveries covered by assorted US Foreign Military Sales (FMS) awards. Djibouti, Lebanon and Romania were three countries listed as possible future recipients of FMTVs in a June 2019 US DoD FMS delivery announcement, with Romania and Lebanon since confirmed.

- Albania
  - Albanian Armed Forces Unknown amount of FMTV M1084A2 vehicles
- Afghanistan
  - Afghan National Army, no details available
- Argentina
  - Argentine Army, est. 48 M1083 A1P2 + 7 M1148.
- Canada
  - Canadian Army, M1148 + LSAC in 2006.
- Cameroon
  - Cameroon Army, 2 × FMTV A1P2 6×6 in 2018. These were delivered under a US$378 million contract awarded in 2016. The order covers 1,543 FMTVs for Cameroon, Iraq, and Somalia, but does not say how many each country will receive.
- Greece
  - Hellenic Army, 300 est. Prior to 2003.
- Djibouti
  - Djibouti Army, no details available
- Iraq
  - Iraqi Army, deliveries include trucks under a US$378 million contract awarded in 2016. The order covers 1,543 FMTVs for Cameroon, Iraq, and Somalia, but does not say how many each country will receive.
- Israel
  - Israeli Army, order for 200 announced January 2017
- Jordan
  - Royal Jordanian Army, >100 since 2006 inc. HIMARS.
- Kenya
- Kosovo
- Kuwait
- Lebanon
  - Lebanese Army, 31 1084A1Ps delivered on 3 March 2021, 11 1083A1Ps delivered on 7 November 2022, 15 1083A1P2s delivered on 19 May 2023. delivered – 2.5- and 5-ton.
- Moldova, Stewart & Stevenson MTV.
- North Macedonia - Army of North Macedonia, 2022. 10 units operational.
- New Zealand
  - New Zealand Army, prior to 2003. M1089 wrecker.
- Poland
- Romania
  - Romanian Army, 54 M1084A1P2 and 10 M1089A1P2 ordered besides HIMARS.
- Saudi Arabia
  - Royal Saudi Air Defense, est. 100 Patriot support vehicles.
- Singapore
  - Singapore Army, HIMARS.
- Somalia, a USD378 million contract was awarded to Oshkosh in 2016 that covers 1,543 FMTVs for Cameroon, Iraq, and Somalia. The award does not say how many each country will receive, and actual deliveries to Somalia are to be confirmed
- South Korea
- Taiwan
  - Republic of China Army, deliveries in 1996 and 2011.
- Thailand
  - Royal Thai Army, deliveries in 1996. Cargo.
- Tunisia
- United Arab Emirates
  - United Arab Emirates, >20 HIMARS.
- Uganda
- United States
  - United States Army, includes Army National Guard and United States Marine Corps. BAE Systems and legacy companies – 74,000 trucks and trailers. Oshkosh Corporation – 36,200 trucks and trailers
- Ukraine dozens of FMTV vehicles were transferred along with the M777 howitzers. Armed Forces of Ukraine also use HIMARS.

(users of the FMTV-based Caiman MRAP are not included)

== See also ==
- BAE Caiman MRAP – based on FMTV chassis and automotives
- M939 series trucks – previous U.S. Army 5-ton truck
- M809 series trucks – previous U.S. Army 5-ton truck (remained in use alongside successor M939 series)
- M35 series trucks – previous U.S. Army 2.5-ton truck
- Oshkosh MTVR
- Heavy Expanded Mobility Tactical Truck
- Palletized load system
- Logistics Vehicle System (LVS)
- Leyland 4-tonne truck
- RMMV HX range of trucks
- Navistar 7000 series—based on International Workstar chassis
