= Centigon =

Centigon may refer to:

- Centigon (unit), a unit of plane angle, the hundredth part of a gon (gradian).
- Centigon (company), a company specializing in security products like armored vehicles
