= Second Chance (body armor) =

American body armor manufacturing company

- Industry: Body armor manufacturing
- Founded: Early 1970s
- Founder: Richard Davis
- Headquarters: United States
- Parent: Armor Holdings, Inc.
- Website: http://www.secondchance.com (Archived 2 February 2006 at the Wayback Machine)

Second Chance is an American body armor manufacturing company. The company was founded in the early 1970s by U.S. Marine and pizza delivery owner/driver Richard Davis. Davis developed the idea of a bulletproof vest after shooting three armed robbers in self-defense during a delivery. This incident was later documented in a 1995 book written by firearms instructor Massad Ayoob called The Ayoob Files: The Book.

Davis started his company out of his garage. In early sales demonstrations, he would put on one of his vests and then shoot himself, usually with a firearm provided by a candidate agency. A patent was filed in 1972.

In 1998, Second Chance introduced Zylon-based body armor (bullet-resistant vests), as a lightweight alternative to kevlar. The Zylon material used in the vests was supplied by Japan-based Toyobo.

In June 2005, the National Institute of Justice, the United States government agency responsible for developing safety standards, determined that these Zylon-based vests did not meet the required standards and might have been defective. The United States Department of Justice advised law enforcement agencies to replace the vests used by police officers.

On August 2, 2005, Second Chance was acquired by Armor Holdings, Inc. for US$45 million.

In 2022, Ramin Bahrani directed a documentary film called 2nd Chance, based on Davis's life and company. It premiered at the Sundance Film Festival.
