= Centigon Security Group =

- Founded: 2014; 12 years ago Lamballe, France
- Products: mobile armor
- Number of employees: less than 800
- Website: www.centigon.com

Centigon Security Group, formerly Carat Security Group is a large, privately held manufacturer of mobile armor. Based in Lamballe, France, the Group is the result of several mergers, including the purchase of Centigon by industry rival, Carat Duchatelet. One of the world's leading commercial armored vehicle providers, it operates six factories worldwide, employs a labor force of 800, and produces 1,400 armored vehicles annually.

Among its subsidiaries' products are armored limousines for heads of states, armored sedans and SUVs, specialized vehicles for transporting cash, ballistic glass, and a variety of vehicles and equipment for the defense industry.

In addition to offering feature-loaded premium transportation CSG also produces simpler, cheaper, less protected "no frills" vehicles aimed at a growing customer base in Africa and the Middle East. Its Black Scorpion Fast Attack Vehicle developed for this niche market was introduced at the Eurosatory 2010 international exhibition of land security and defense vehicles in Paris. In April 2011, Carat made its first appearance in China, with a trade show in Shanghai; presenting two Carat Duchatelet armored limousines.

In 2014 Carat and Centigon parted again.

== See also ==
- Ballistic glass
- Armored car (military)
- Armored car (valuables)
- Armored car (VIP)
- Official state car
