= Zylon =

- Skeletal formula of a Zylon monomer

Names
- IUPAC name poly(p-phenylene-2,6-benzobisoxazole)

Identifiers
CAS Number	60857-81-0
CompTox Dashboard (EPA)	DTXSID60107887

Properties
Chemical formula	C_{14}H_{6}N_{2}O_{2}
Molar mass	234.214 g·mol^{−1}
- Except where otherwise noted, data are given for materials in their standard state (at 25 °C [77 °F], 100 kPa). Infobox references

Zylon (IUPAC name: poly(p-phenylene-2,6-benzobisoxazole)) is a trademarked name for a range of thermoset liquid-crystalline polyoxazole. This synthetic polymer material was invented and developed by SRI International in the 1980s and manufactured by Toyobo. In generic usage, the fiber is referred to as PBO.

Zylon has 5.8 GPa of tensile strength, which is 1.6 times that of Kevlar. Additionally, Zylon has a high Young's modulus of 270 GPa, meaning that it is stiffer than steel. Like Kevlar, Zylon is used in a number of applications that require very high strength with excellent thermal stability. The material has been used in body armour, in tennis racquets, table tennis paddles, and in snowboards, in various medical applications, and in some of the Martian rovers.

== Usage ==
=== Body armor ===
Zylon gained wide use in U.S. police officers body armor protection in 1998 with its introduction by Second Chance Body Armor, Inc. in its "Ultima" and "Ultimax" protective vests. At least as early as 2002 August, Point Blank Body armor offered "Fusion" and as early as October, it offered "Legacy". Armor Holdings's Safariland offered ZERO-G Platinum as its Zylon option, and oldest brand, its very own American Body Armor, had its most premier option also made with Zylon. Zylon body armor panels sometimes cost twice as much as Kevlar or 35% more than other advanced materials. Despite "sticker shock", the marketing for Zylon body armor described incredibly low weight and thickness, but shockingly high protection, causing some to refer to it as a "miracle fiber".

==== The incident and the aftermath ====
Protective vests constructed with Zylon were questioned after June 13, 2003, when Oceanside, California, Police Officer Tony Zeppetella's and Forest Hills, Pennsylvania Police Officer Ed Limbacher's vests both failed, leaving Zeppetella mortally wounded and Limbacher seriously injured.

On Sept 15 2003, Second Chance's president and CEO wrote a letter about Zylon and what his company's position about Zylon, and what their reaction was going to be. He started by stating that the ULTIMA line had 30 "saves". He described two years of testing "200 ULTIMA vests from 37 different agencies in 19 different States".

He then said "Unfortunately, for all involved these results indicated the unexpected decrease in the ZYLON fiber strength. ZYLON fibers in various forms are used widely within our industry. Although inconsistent, these results have led us to where we are today. ULTIMA and ULTIMAX vests, as you know them today, have been discontinued from our product line."

The company would offer a "Performance Pac" to "account the worst-case performance scenarios of used, in service vests", for free.

Stephen Croskrey, President and CEO of Armor Holdings Products Division (Owners of American Body Armor, PROTECH and Safariland) put out a letter as a reaction to the statements by Second Chance. In the letter, the CEO states that he found the "unexpected decrease" statement by Second Chance to be vague. He then said his company and Toyobo tested the material regularly, and that it was degrading at a rate typical compared to other materials. Finally, he stated that for his company, all incoming lots of materials had some tested, and they regularly received used vests to test.

==== The realization and end to Zylon's use in body armor ====
Some studies subsequently reported that the Zylon vests might degrade over time and leave their wearers with less protection than expected. Second Chance eventually recalled all of its Zylon vests, which led to its bankruptcy. The company was once able to claim that it held over 50% of the market for law enforcement body armor, all by itself. This explains why 98,000 vests were recalled by Second Chance alone. Comparable vests cost as much as $1450 at the time, or over $2100 at the end of 2014.

In early 2005, Armor Holdings, Inc. recalled its Zylon-based products, and decreased the rated lifespan warranty of new vests from 60 months to 30 months. In August 2005, AHI decided to discontinue manufacturing all of its Zylon-containing vests. This was largely based on the actions of the U.S. government's National Institute of Justice, which decertified Zylon for use in its approved models of ballistic vests for law enforcement.

The United States Justice Department launched numerous investigations into possible violations of the False Claims Act regarding the defective vests. Throughout the course of litigation, settlements totaling more than $136 million were reached with 18 entities involved in the production and sale of Zylon vests. The investigations concluded after nearly two decades when the final settlement was obtained with material supplier Honeywell International in late 2022.

=== Space elevator research ===
A competition was held in the Wirefly X Prize Cup in Las Cruces, New Mexico, on October 20–21, 2006. A team from the University of British Columbia entered into the Tether Challenge, using a construction made from Zylon fibers. The house tether used by Spaceward, that the other teams would have to beat in strength by 50% in the 2007 Spaceward games, was made of Zylon.

=== High-altitude balloon science ===
Zylon is used by NASA in long-duration, high-altitude data collection. Braided Zylon strands maintain the structure of polyethylene superpressure balloons. Zylon is the material of choice due to its low weight, high tensile strength, and thermal properties.

=== Motorsport ===
Since 2001 Zylon tethers are used in Formula One to attach the wheels to the chassis, thus preventing the wheel from ejecting into a crowded area in the event of an accident which causes the wheel to become airborne. Starting in the 2007 season, the driver's cockpit must now be clad in special anti-penetration panels made of Zylon. In 2011, a Zylon strip was introduced to reinforce the top of the racing helmet visor and provide an overlap between the visor and helmet for additional protection after Felipe Massa's 2009 injury. The Indy Racing League began using Zylon in 2008.

=== Standing rigging ===
On modern racing yachts, Zylon is used for parts of the standing rigging. It is used as shrouds and stays. The PBO (polybenzoxazole) fiber is degraded by UV light, seawater, and chafing (the problem that caused Zylon to be removed from usage in protective vests for police usage, as shown above), and is therefore protected by a synthetic melted-on jacket. It is claimed to be 65% lighter than traditional rigging at 110–130% of the price of rod rigging. Based on laboratory tests, superior durability is also claimed.

=== Parachutes ===
SpaceX uses Zylon for the suspension lines on their Mk3 parachutes. Four Mk3 parachutes serve as the main parachutes on each of SpaceX's human-rated Crew Dragon spacecraft.

=== Conductive textile ===
Zylon has been incorporated as the base fiber for some conductive textiles, where the Zylon fiber is plated with nickel, copper, silver, or gold. The conductive fiber is used for electronic textiles, EMI shielding in woven or knit sheets, or as a braid over wires, and for signal transmission or current conduction. This conductive fiber combines the advantages of Zylon (strength, resistance to high temperatures, durability, lightweight, etc.) with the electrical properties of various metals. The conductive yarns can be sewn, braided, knit, or simply insulated like a bare wire.

=== Structural rehabilitation ===
PBO is the strongest and stiffest of commercially available fibers used to repair and strengthen concrete and masonry structures in externally bonded composite systems. In this system, the fibers are produced in the form of a fabric mesh, and a cementitious mortar matrix bonds this to an existing structure.

=== Loudspeakers ===
Yamaha uses Zylon to make the speaker cones for its top-of-the-line NS-5000 speaker.

Krell's first production automotive application is on top-of-the-line Acura RLX (a.k.a Honda Legend worldwide) uses six 6.7-inch speakers with diaphragms constructed by Zylon, which responds very quickly to musical input and stops moving just as quickly when the musical signal stops. Compared to the polypropylene diaphragm material that is used in the vast majority of car audio speakers, Zylon has far less unwanted vibration, resulting in a much cleaner and more detailed sound.

=== Bicycle and wheelchair wheel spokes ===
Spinergy, Inc. produces wheels for bicycles and wheelchairs with PBO spokes. They claim their PBO fiber spokes act as a vibration and shock damper, while being lighter and stronger than steel spokes.

== See also ==
- Synthetic fiber
- Aramid
  - Technora
  - Twaron
- Dyneema
- Vectran
