= Armor Holdings =

Former American manufacturer of safety equipment

Armor Holdings, Inc.
- Company type: Subsidiary
- Industry: Defense
- Founded: January 1, 1996
- Headquarters: Jacksonville, Florida, United States
- Owner: BAE Systems
- Parent: BAE Systems Land and Armaments
- Divisions: acquired vehicle division of Stewart & Stevenson
- Website: www.armorholdings.com

Armor Holdings, Inc. was an American manufacturer of military, law enforcement, and personnel safety equipment. It was acquired by BAE Systems on July 31, 2007 and renamed BAE Systems Mobility & Protection Systems. The divisions have been reorganised within BAE Systems Land and Armaments.

== History ==
Armor Holdings was founded in 1969 as American Body Armor and Equipment, Inc. at Jacksonville, Florida. In January 1996 the company underwent a change in control; Kanders Florida Holdings, Inc. and others purchased the stock held by the company's two largest shareholders. The Armor Holdings, Inc. name was adopted on August 21, 1996.

It acquired Fairfield, Ohio-based O'Gara-Hess & Eisenhardt in 2001 and renamed it Centigon.

In 2003, it acquired Simula, Inc. a developer and producer of military seating systems, the Cockpit Air Bag System (CABS) for US Army helicopters, the Small Arms Protective Insert (SAPI) armor system, and parachutes. Simula developed and produced the first crashworthy armored crew seats for the US Army UH-60 Black Hawk and AH-64 Apache helicopters.

On August 2, 2005, Armor Holdings acquired Second Chance, a body armor manufacturing company, for $45 million.

In 2006, Armor Holdings obtained a $649 million order for the U.S. Army to manufacture tactical vehicle trucks. In this same year it acquired the vehicle division of Stewart & Stevenson, which originally built the tactical vehicle truck for the Army.

=== BAE acquisition ===
On May 7, 2007 BAE Systems announced its subsidiary BAE Systems Inc. was to purchase Armor Holdings for US$4.1 billion (US$4.5 billion including net debt). The acquisition was completed on July 31, 2007.

Armor Holdings' three business units; Aerospace & Defense Group, the Products Group and the Mobile Security Division were merged into BAE Systems as Mobility & Protection Systems, BAE Systems Products Group, and BAE Systems Mobile Security respectively.

== Products ==
Its products include the Caiman MRAP vehicle, Family of Medium Tactical Vehicles (FMTV), the Pinzgauer High Mobility All-Terrain Vehicle, as well as armor kits and components for the HMMWV and Medium Tactical Vehicle Replacement (MTVR) (through subcontractor, Plasan Sasa). It also produces the majority of the US Army's MOLLE equipment.

It delivered its Maneuver Sustainment Vehicle (MSV) to US Army for evaluation in Future Tactical Truck System competition, along with Navistar International and Lockheed Martin.

== Zylon body armor settlement ==
On October 7, 2008, the US Department of Justice announced a $30 million settlement with Armor Holdings Products LLC over claims that Armor Holdings knowingly violated the Federal False Claims Act by selling defective Zylon body armor to the government. This is part of a larger investigation of Zylon armor by the DOJ and the military.
