= Stewart & Stevenson =

American industrial manufacturer and distributor since 1902

- Company type: Private
- Industry: Manufacturing, Distribution, Rental and Parts & Service
- Founded: 1902, Houston, Texas
- Founders: C. Jim Stewart and Joseph R. Stevenson
- Headquarters: Houston, Texas, United States
- Website: www.stewartandstevenson.com

Stewart & Stevenson is a manufacturer and distributor of products and services for the oil and gas, marine, construction, power generation, transportation, mining and agricultural industries.

== History ==
In 1902, Stewart & Stevenson originated in Houston, Texas, as a blacksmith shop shoeing horses, and a carriage shop manufacturing carriages and wagons. In 1905, C. Jim Stewart & Stevenson repaired their first horseless carriage.

In 1920, as the automobile became more prevalent, the company shifted its focus to automobile repair and customization. In 1923 the company became a GMC truck distributor and builder of truck body variants.

From 1938 through the 1950s, the company manufactured a “swamp buggy” for support of oil exploration in Gulf Coast marsh areas.

In 1958, the company entered the aircraft ground support business using GM Detroit Diesels. During the decade, it designed and built approximately 1000 low silhouette, self-propelled GPUs with a 400 Hz, 90 kVA generator set for major airlines. Later, in 1959 Stewart & Stevenson became a distributor for Hyster industrial forklifts.

During the 1960s, the company designed and produced oilfield self-propelled service units under the trade name “Fieldmaster.” In 1962, the group expanded the ground support equipment product line with tow tractors for various airlines and in 1963 built oilfield hydraulic fracturing pump trucks.

Between 1963 and 1966, the company entered the gas-turbine powered industry and pleasure craft engines. In 1969 the company designed and built Land Leveler vehicles used for leveling an area that was to be flooded with water for rice fields. In the 1970s the company formed the Thermo King division. In 1975, it began GM Detroit Diesel engine sales in Venezuela.

In 1980, the company started building GE gas turbine power packages for offshore oil rigs. 1985 saw the California Cogen – power producing industry and the company competed for the U.S. Army’s M939 A2 5-ton truck program.

Through a joint venture with Mercedes-Benz, Stewart & Stevenson built 700 “Starship” transit buses from 1987-1992.

In 1988 the company was granted exclusive territory for Electro-Motive Diesel engines, including 10 southern states, Mexico, and Central America. In 1989 it was awarded a John Deere light industrial dealership.

In the 1990s, the company designed and built the Rail King railcar mover, was awarded a contract to build $1.2 billion of 2.5 and 5-ton trucks for the U.S. Army, purchased Foley Valves – an oil field equipment supplier, acquired PAMCO – Waukesha gas compression & generating equipment, and signed an agreement with European Gas Turbines Ltd. - a packager of mid-range units. The company marketed large self-propelled snowblowers for use at airports and on roadways and also competed for the US Marine Corp / US Army Medium Tactical Vehicle Replacement (MTVR) Program, and began production of year two of a multi-year contract for the next FMTV increment of 10,000 vehicles. The FMTV vehicle design was based on a Steyr 12 M 18 platform.

In 2000, the company sold its gas-turbine division to GE Power Systems and acquired TUG aircraft ground support vehicles business. The following year, the company sold its John Deere dealership and formed the 'Specialty Wheeled Vehicle Division. On October 18, 2002, Stewart & Stevenson stock moved onto the New York Stock Exchange with the shares selling under the new ticker symbol "SVC."

In 2006, the vehicle division was sold to Armor Holdings; other divisions were acquired by Hushang Ansary.

In 2015, Anthony James Davis was named CEO. This appointment, in addition to his appointment to the board was effective February 2016.

Stewart and Stevenson was acquired by Kirby Corporation ("Kirby") (NYSE: KEX) on September 13, 2017 and became part of Kirby's Distribution and Services business.

== Product offerings ==
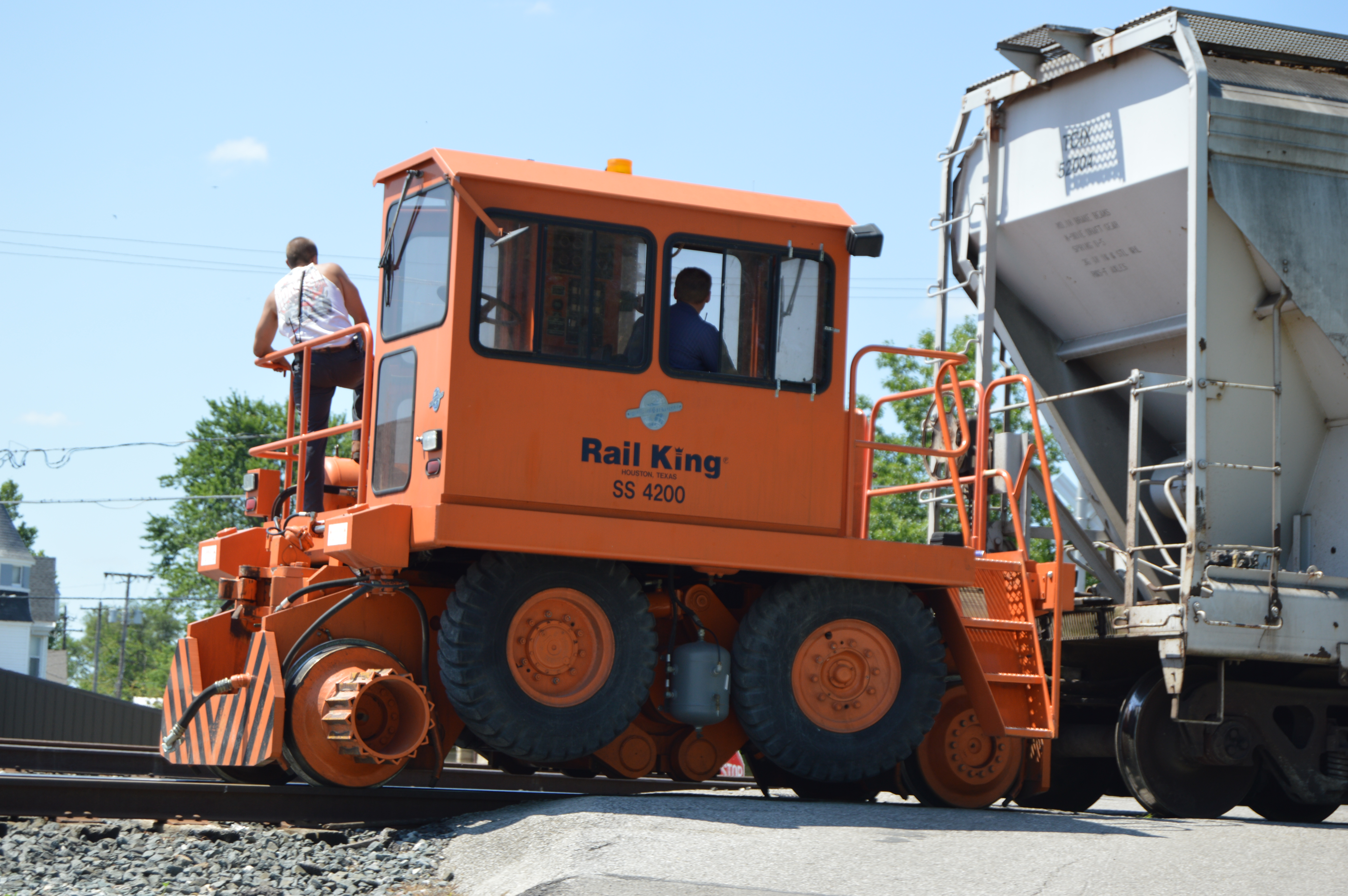
A Rail King rail car mover

The company manufactures oilfield equipment that includes truck, trailer, and skid mounted fracturing blenders and pumpers and units for chemical additive, cementing, coiled tubing, nitrogen pumping, controls, and power generation equipment; land-based drilling, workover, and well servicing rigs; and Rail King railcar movers. Stewart & Stevenson is a distributor of diesel and natural gas engines, transmissions, and materials handling equipment. Stewart & Stevenson partners with original equipment manufacturers such as MTU, Detroit Diesel, DEUTZ, and Allison Transmission. The company also provides aftermarket parts and service and offer rental to a broad range of customers. Headquartered in Houston, Texas since its founding in 1902, Stewart & Stevenson provides equipment and service to the global market from a network of sales and service centers in domestic and international locations.

The company produced 335KW 480V diesel generators for uses including hospitals.

The markets served by the company include Oil & Gas, Power Generation, On-Highway/Transportation, Rail, Marine, Mining, Construction/Industrial, Agriculture, and Military/Government.

== See also ==
- List of oilfield service companies
