= Centigon (company) =

Trademark, division of the Centigon Security Group

Centigon is a division of the Centigon Security Group. The company traces its roots back to coach builder Sayers & Scovill, later Hess & Eisenhardt and then O'Gara-Hess & Eisenhardt. In October 2026, Centigon joined the Roshel Group, bringing its operations in France, Mexico and Colombia into the group.

In 2001, the company became part of Armor Holdings, Inc a provider of security products and services which in late 2005 reorganized its mobile security division under the Centigon brand name. Centigon was founded in 1998 as the O'Gara-Hess & Eisenhardt subsidiary located in Colombia to service the Andean Pact area. It mostly produced armored versions of civilian vehicles. In 2007 Armor Holdings was purchased by BAE Systems plc. BAE sold Centigon to Carat Duchatelet Holdings in February 2008. In March, 2010, Centigon became one of three brands under the recently launched master brand, the Carat Security Group, headquartered in Lamballe, France.

The global Centigon Security Group network operates five facilities in four countries, including production facilities in Mexico City and Monterrey, Mexico; Caracas, Venezuela; and Bogotá, Colombia, as well as group headquarters in Lamballe, France. The headquarters houses the Group's "design center of excellence", providing worldwide operations with design and production methodologies, after sales service and support.

== History ==
Sayers & Scovill first started manufacturing coaches in 1876 in Cincinnati, Ohio, United States. The company built its first motorcar body in 1906. Emil E. Hess and Charles A. Eisenhardt, Sr. began working at S&S in 1891 and acquired the assets and trademarks of the company in 1942. Production of commercial armored vehicles began in 1946. A few years later H&E prepared bullet-resistant cars for then President Harry S. Truman and his wife Bess. Hess & Eisenhardt thereafter provided mobile security for more than sixty international heads-of-state, every American President between 1948 and 2001, numerous U.S. government agencies, the U.S. Army and the U.S. Air Force.

In 1982 the O'Gara brothers (Hess & Eisenhardt international sales agents) acquired the Armored Car Division of Hess & Eisenhardt, forming O'Gara-Hess & Eisenhardt, a specialty vehicle manufacturer based in Fairfield, Ohio. O'Gara armored a variety of vehicles, including limousines, sedans, sport utility vehicles, and cash-in-transit vehicles, to protect against varying degrees of ballistic and blast threats. The company also built armored personnel carriers, mobile water cannon and pursuit vehicles. It was the prime contractor to the U.S. Military for the supply of armoring and blast protection for the ubiquitous Humvee.

During the 1990s manufacturing subsidiaries were opened in Mexico, Brazil, France, Russia, Colombia and the Philippines. In 2000 O'Gara introduced IMPAKтм, the world's first aramid bullet resistant fabric designed for passenger vehicles.

On 23 April 2001 Armor Holdings agreed to buy the security products and security group of The Kroll O'Gara Co., including O'Gara-Hess and Eisenhardt, absorbing the latter and retiring its name. The acquisition was completed on 23 August 2001 for $53.7 million.

On 7 May 2007 BAE Systems announced its subsidiary BAE Systems Inc. was to purchase Armor Holdings for US$4.1 billion (US$4.5 billion including net debt). The acquisition was completed on 31 July 2007. Discussing the integration of Armor Holdings, President and CEO of BAE Systems Inc. Walt Havenstein said the company was undecided on the future of the Centigon division: "We still have to assess how we want to approach that market, either from a U.S.-centered perspective or from a global perspective, so that's a little less clear". BAE completed the sale of Centigon to Carat Duchatelet Holdings on 26 February 2008.

In March, 2010 the Centigon brand was placed under the new overall branding umbrella Carat Security Group, sharing status with Carat Duchatelet and the newly created Carat Defense brands. The Centigon brand features standard wheelbase armored sedans, sport utility vehicles and cash in transit offerings. Brand offerings include the exclusive OEM-certified armored Land Rover Discovery IV, Jaguar Sentinel and independently certified armored Land Cruiser 200. Global production under the Centigon brand exceeds 1400 armored vehicles per year worldwide.

In the end of 2014, the Chinese Group Dongfeng Design Institute Co Ltd. acquired Centigon and started to redefine the company in terms of objectives and strategy. In 2016, the Centigon Security Group was founded and owned five different factories around the world and one production site dedicated to the manufacture of bulletproof glasses. Centigon also possesses strong partnerships with several European OEMs (Jaguar Land Rover, Renault, Peugeot, Scania...) and is now starting to tackle the Asian market, in particular Chinese manufacturers such as Brilliance or Jinbei.

Centigon France (29 million euros in turnover, 170 employees in 2020) is one of the world leaders in small armored vehicles. Founded in 1948 under the name of Labbé, the industrialist produces 350 vehicles each year from one to 40 tonnes: armored cars for CEOs, businessmen, diplomats or heads of state, vehicles for transporting funds, maintaining security. order, but also engines intended for the gendarmerie and the armed forces.

Ownership change in 2026

On 2 October 2026, Roshel announced that Centigon had joined the Roshel Group following the completion of transaction. Centigon's operations in France, Mexico and Colombia became part of the group. These include the design and manufacture of armored truck cabs and the conversion of vehicles in France, the production of armored civilian, cash-in-transit and tactical vehicles in Mexico, and the manufacture of ballistic glass for vehicles and buildings in Colombia.
