= MCPS =

MCPS can refer to:

- Mechanical-Copyright Protection Society
- Member of College of Physicians and Surgeons, a membership offered by the College of Physicians and Surgeons Pakistan
- Microsoft Cordless Phone System, the first phone produced by Microsoft
- Minnesota Center for Philosophy of Science, at the University of Minnesota, Twin Cities
- Millions of cycles per second (better known as Megahertz), a frequency measure used for processing speed in computers
- Media Access Control (MAC) Common Part Sublayer
- Modular Command Post System

Schools and school districts

- Maury County Public Schools
- Montgomery Catholic Preparatory School, Montgomery, Alabama
- Montgomery County Public Schools (Maryland)
- Montgomery County Public Schools (Virginia)
- McCracken County Public Schools
- Marion County Public Schools, Marion County, Florida
