= M577 command post carrier =

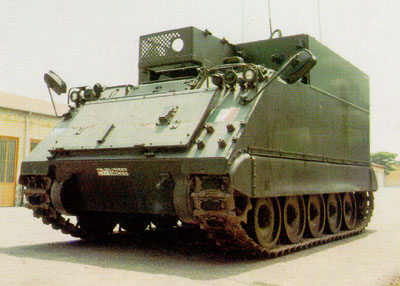
- Type: Armored personnel carrier
- Place of origin: United States

Service history
- In service: 1963–present
- Used by: See Operators
- Wars: Vietnam War; Six-Day War; Yom Kippur War; Iran–Iraq War; 1982 Lebanon War; Gulf War; War in Afghanistan; Iraq War; Russo-Ukrainian War

Production history
- Designer: FMC Corporation
- Designed: 1962
- Manufacturer: BAE Systems (from 2005)
- No. built: over 7300
- Variants: see Variants

Specifications
- Mass: see Basic versions
- Length: 194 inches (4.93 m)
- Width: 105.8 inches (2.69 m)
- Height: 106.5 inches (2.71 m)
- Crew: 2 (driver + commander)
- Passengers: 3 operators
- Armor: 5083 aluminum alloy 38–45 millimetres (1.5–1.8 in)
- Engine: see Basic versions
- Drive: tracked
- Transmission: see Basic versions
- Suspension: torsion bar, 5 road wheels
- Fuel capacity: 120 US gallons (454 litres)
- Operational range: see Basic versions
- Maximum speed: see Basic versions
- Steering system: hydrostatic, integrated with transmission

The M577 command post carrier, also known as the M577 command post vehicle or armored command post vehicle, is a variant of the M113 armored personnel carrier that was developed and produced by the FMC Corporation to function on the battlefield as a mobile command post i.e. a tactical operations centre, usually at the battalion level. In U.S. military service its official designation is Carrier, Command Post, Light Tracked M577.

Introduced to the U.S. Army in 1962 it soon saw operational service in the Vietnam War and more recently in the 2003 invasion of Iraq. It is used by many armies around the world and has been adapted for further uses such as an armored ambulance, emergency medical treatment vehicle and fire control vehicle. It is also used by various police forces and law enforcement agencies as a tactical response vehicle.

The M577 is easily distinguished from the M113 upon which it is based by its raised upper hull and roof-mounted auxiliary power unit (APU). Vehicles are generally unarmed.

== Background ==
The experience gained by the U.S. Army in the Second World War showed that close co-operation between infantry and armored forces is a necessity for combined-arms mechanized mobile warfare. Mobile warfare increases both the scope and size of the theatre of operations, and mobile command and control posts are necessary to co-ordinate operations at the divisional, brigade and battalion levels.

Whereas tanks and armored cars offered a level of protection against weapons fire, they usually did not provide sufficient internal room to permit the extra personnel needed to operate all the radio sets. Lightly or unarmed vehicles could be used to transport temporary structures (e.g. tents) that gave greater work space, but these structures lacked protection from direct and indirect weapons fire, and advancing front line units could exceed the communication range the command post, necessitating the dismantling and removal of the structure to a new location. Experience gained in the snow and mud in the Korean War showed the advantage of tracked over wheeled vehicles.

In 1960, no such vehicle existed in the U.S. Army inventory that was able to satisfy all of these requirements.

== Development ==
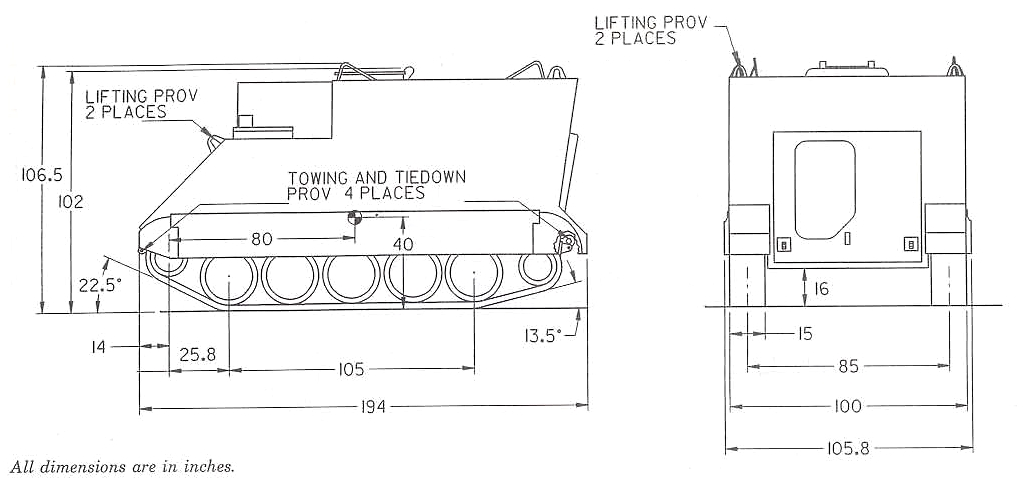
M577 dimensions

The first four prototypes were built in February 1962 by United Defense Industries at the U.S. Army's Detroit Arsenal. They were designated the XM577, (Note: The prefix 'X' in the designation indicates an experimental vehicle) and were conversions of M113 APCs. Upon completion in March 1962 the first vehicle was shipped to the Aberdeen Proving Ground for engineering tests, while the remaining three vehicles were shipped to the Armor, Infantry and Artillery Boards for evaluation tests.

The results of all tests were generally positive, and the vehicle went into immediate production. The first batch of 270 vehicles were accepted into U.S. Army service between in December 1962 and March 1963. In March 1963 under Standard A Acceptance the XM577 was redesignated as the M577, indicating official status as a regular production vehicle. Production began on a second batch of 674 vehicles in November 1963, all of which entered service by the middle of 1964.

== Design ==
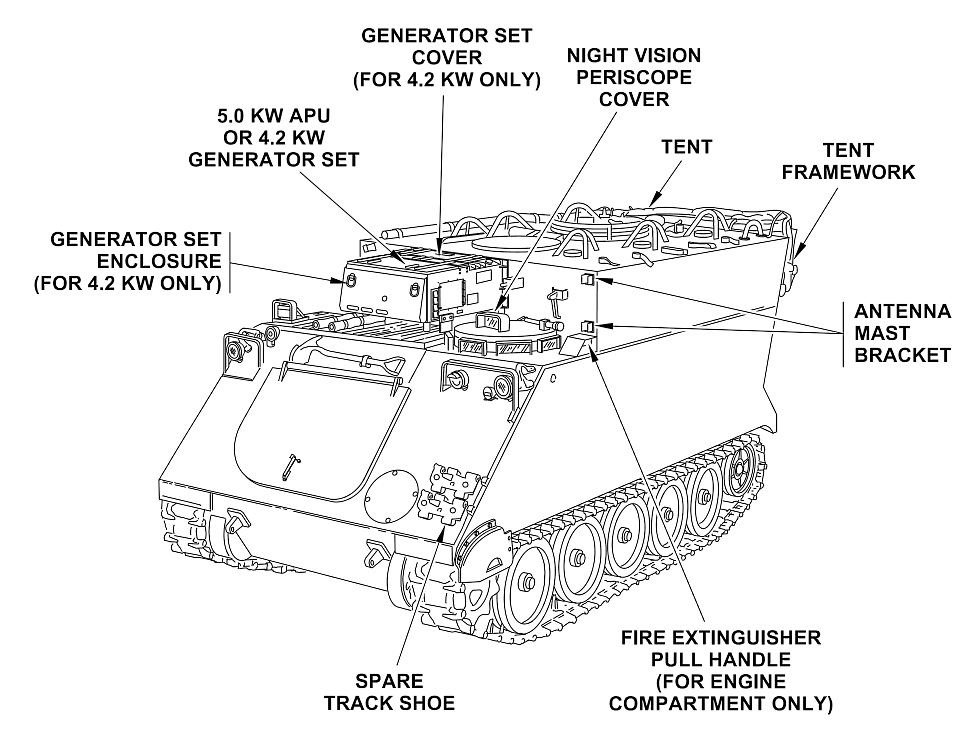
Major components of the M577A3 command post carrier

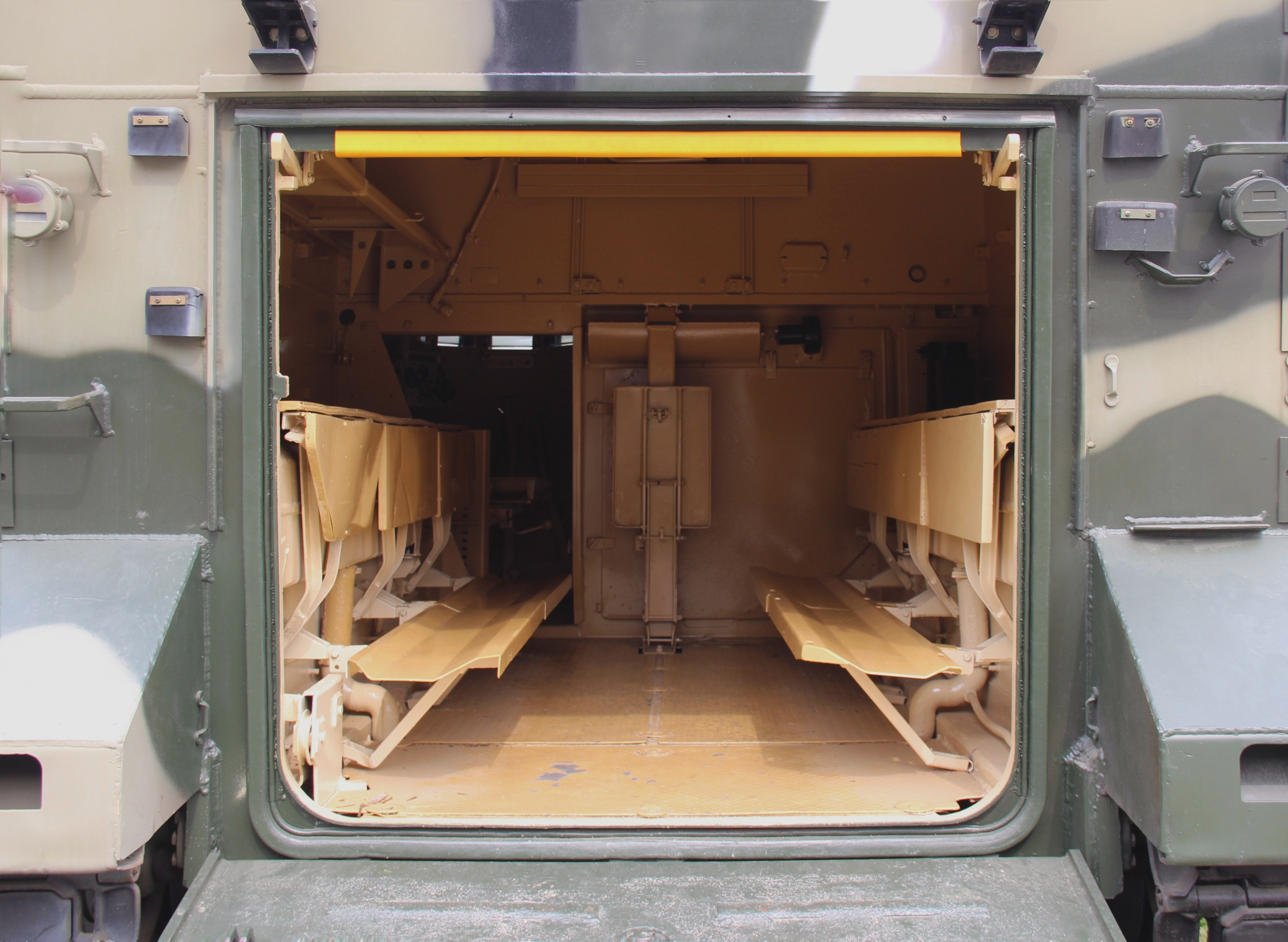
The interior of a M577. The additional headroom compared to a M113 is clearly visible.

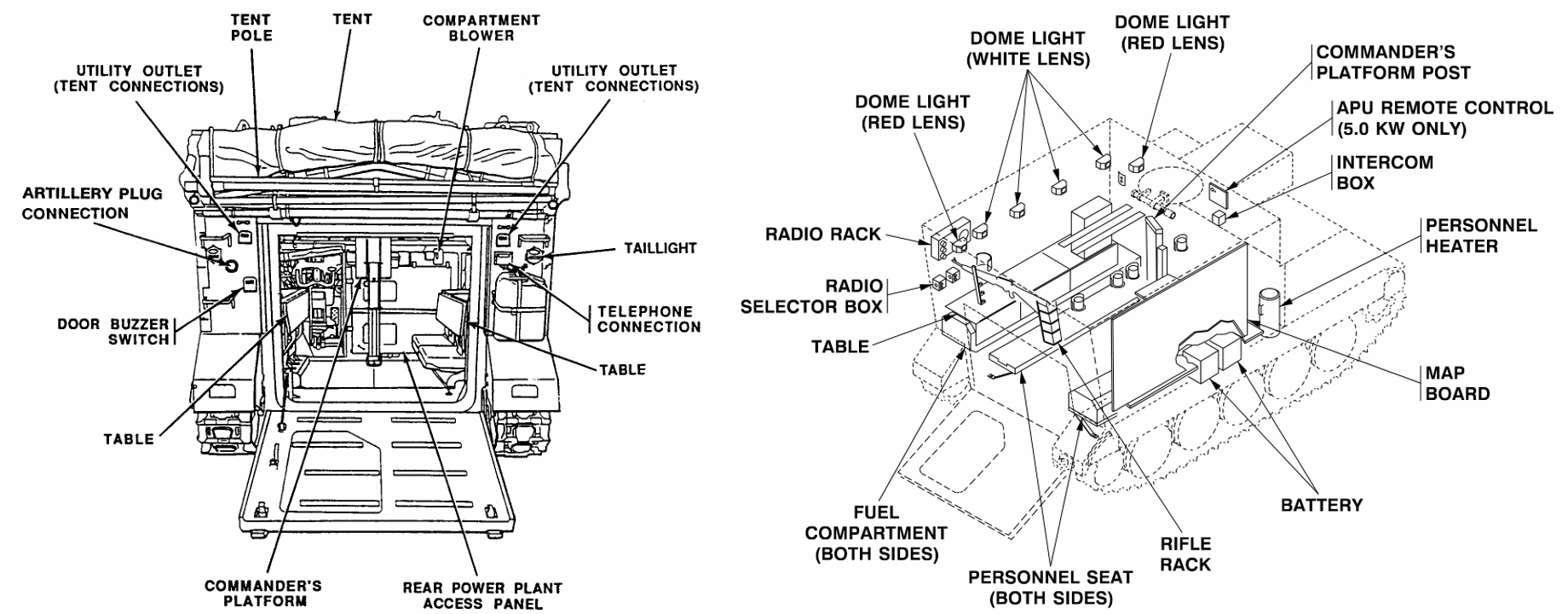
M577A3 rear view and interior layout

M577 Man inside standing

=== Chassis and hull ===
The M577 shares the chassis, lower hull and running gear from the M113 upon which it is based. The hull sides from the engine firewall to the rear cargo ramp were extended by 25.25 in (64 cm) for a maximum headroom in the rear compartment of 74.75 in (190 cm), allowing operators to perform duties standing up. On the roof, the commander's cupola of the M113 APC has been replaced with circular hatch similar to the driver's hatch, and the large rectangular hatch over the troop compartment was removed. There is no external weapons stations fitted to the M577, although most vehicles were fitted with an internal rifle rack.

=== Electrical system ===
Mounted to the front of the raised upper hull, centrally located to the right of the driver's hatch, is a 4.2 kW 28V 150A gasoline auxiliary power unit generator, that provides power to the M577/M1068's auxiliary equipment, dependent upon variant as specified below, without the vehicle's main engine running. The unit can be used to power two vehicles, and can be removed from its mounting basket using a lifting davit located on the vehicle's roof and operated from within or alongside the vehicle using a 50 ft (15.24 m) extension cable.

As part of the A3 upgrade, a more powerful 5.0 kW unit was fitted. Unlike the previous gasoline-fuelled unit, the new unit operates on diesel fuel, providing more hours of operation on an equivalent fuel load.

=== Interior ===
The single 80 gallon internal fuel tank of the M113, located at the rear left, is replaced by two 60 gallon tanks, located each side near the rear, providing a greater operating range than a M113. They also serve as the base for fold-out tables. Radios are usually fitted along the left wall, as well as the front of the right wall. Map boards are usually fitted along the walls, along with additional storage facilities for maps and code books etc.

Overhead dome lights were fitted within the rear compartment. A personal heater is located at the front right of the compartment, which serves as an equipment heater in Arctic and winter operations.

A 5-man bench seat could be fitted to either or both sides of the rear compartment, although in some vehicles no seating was fitted whatsoever. The rearward-facing seat on the commander's station was removed. For the M1068, inward-facing individual seats for two operators replaced the bench seat. Further folding tables and chairs are often carried, stowed while the vehicle is in transit.

=== Equipment ===
Equipment fitted within the rear compartment of the M577/M1068 varies according to the vehicle's purpose.

==== Command post vehicles ====
Vehicles are equipped with additional radio sets as found in a standard M113 APC, to provide command and control facilities across the unit (e.g. battalion) and coordinate with other units and higher levels of command (e.g. regimental HQ). Removable antenna masts are usually carried and attached to the vehicle's roof.

In U.S. Army service, each vehicle usually carries three of four different communications suites (radio sets), each providing a specific communication network according to the communications roles they were assigned e.g. to divisional headquarters, across all vehicles within the unit (battalion), etc. The suites operated over amplitude modulation (AM), continuous wave (CW) and frequency modulation (FM), with the frequencies and number of channels, and transmission and reception range determined by the set. Communication suites were originally analogue, but with the introduction of the M577A3 and A4, have mostly been upgraded to digital. Analogue radio sets fitted to the M577 in U.S. service include:

- AM/CW:
  - AN/GRC-19
  - AN/VRC-24
  - AN/CRR-5
  - AN/WRC-29
- FM (original):
  - AN/VRC-3 to AN/VRC-8
  - AN/VRC-10
  - AN/VRC-13 to AN/VRC-15
  - AN/VRC-20 to AN/VRC-22
- FM (later):
  - AN/VRC-26
  - AN/VRC-46, AN/VRC-47
  - AN/VIC-1
- Interphone:
  - AN/DIC-1
- Teletype:
  - AN/GRC-24

==== Medical vehicles ====
It must be recognized that there was no such thing as a standardized M577 medical vehicle. Vehicles were configured according to the country operating them and internal configuration and equipment varied accordingly, which was also defined as to whether they were used as an emergency evacuation (ambulance) or treatment vehicles.

In U.S. service it appears that M577s were only used as emergency evacuation vehicles very early in their operation careers, i.e. in the early years of the Vietnam War. This role was soon provided solely by M113 "armored ambulances", and the M577 was then only used as emergency treatment vehicles (e.g. battalion aid stations).

When configured as an ambulance, compared to a M113 which could be fitted with up to four litters, the extra room inside the M577 allowed it to carry two additional litters i.e. up to a maximum of six.

==== Other variants ====
Vehicles configured for other roles were configured with specialized equipment accordingly e.g. M577 Fire Control Vehicles were often fitted with TACFIRE artillery control consoles.

=== Tent extension ===
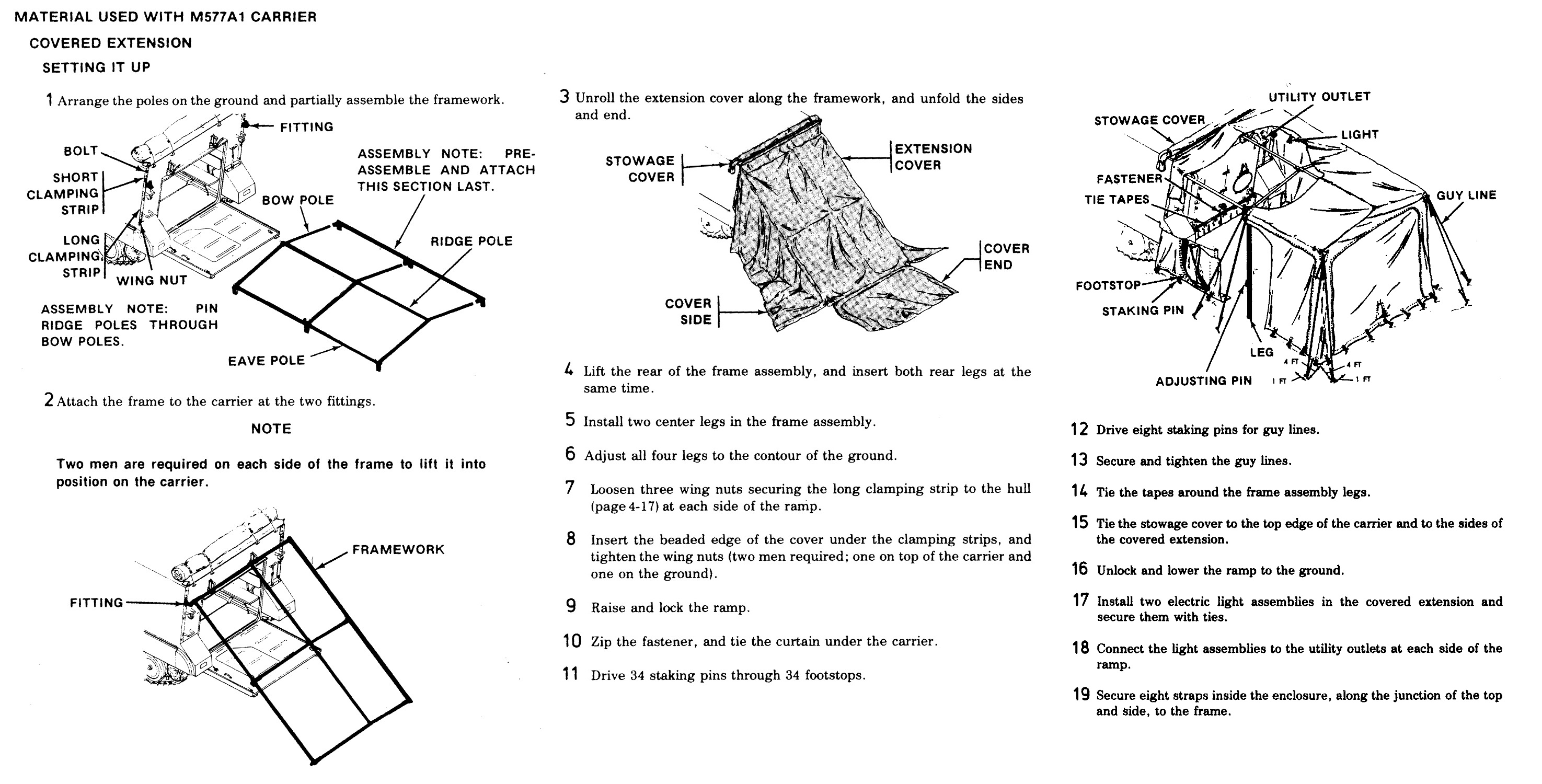
A M577A1 Tent Instructions

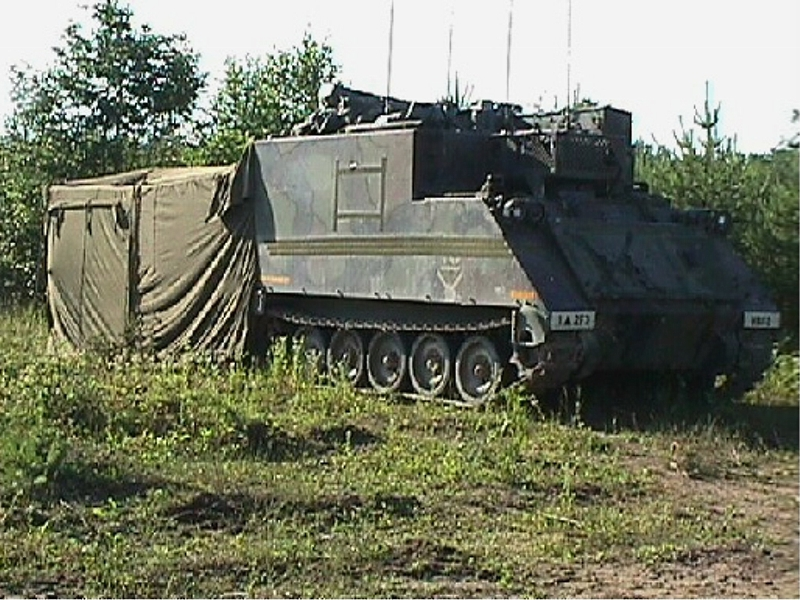
M577 with a MCPS tent

A tent extension attaches to the rear of the vehicle above and around the rear cargo ramp, increasing the workspace available to operators, and in the case of the emergency treatment vehicles, to function as a field dressing station or hospital. The tent is erected over collapsible steel tubing, which is carried in brackets on the rear of the vehicle. The tent can be connected to up to four vehicles parked in a cross, to provide a common work area.

With the introduction of the M1068 SICPS Carrier, the M577-specific tent was replaced with a Modular Command Post System (MCPS) tent, which attaches to the rear of the vehicle by a "bootwall" that covers the rear of the vehicle but still has an entrance to the vehicle's interior. The MCPS tent has the advantage of being quicker and easier to erect and dismantle, provides overhead lighting and power sockets for electrical equipment, and the modular design of MCPS allows more tents to be easily connected.

== Production ==
Ownership of title for and production of the M577 has changed many times over the vehicle's history due to corporate buy-outs and take-overs. Originally produced by FMC's combat vehicles division United Defense Industries (UDI), in 1995 UDI was purchased by Harsco Corporation to become United Defense (UD). In 2005 UD was then purchased by BAE Systems (BAE). As of February 2020, the M577 is within the company's Global Combat Systems Ground Vehicles portfolio of current products in the subsidiary BAE Systems Platforms & Services.

The M577 is produced or remanufactured locally in several countries under licence from or in partnership with BAE. This includes:

- Australia, by Tenix Defence
- Germany, by Flensburger Fahrzeugbau GmbH (FFG)
- Italy, by OTO Melara
- South Korea, by Daewoo Heavy Industries
- Taiwan, by the Republic of China Armoured Vehicle Development Center
- Turkey, by FNSS Defence Systems

In total, more than 7,300 vehicles have been built, of which around 3,900 were M577A1 (Note: Many of these vehicles were later upgraded to A2 and A3 specification.), making the M577 the most numerous single variant of the M113 family after the APC.

== Basic versions ==
The M577 has followed a similar upgrade path to the M113 upon which it is based, resulting in the following basic versions:

=== M577 ===
The original version based upon the M113 chassis. Specifications and performance are as follows:

Engine	Chrysler 75M; 5.9L V8 4-stroke gasoline 209 hp (156 kW) @4000rpm
Transmission	Allison TX-200-2A; 4 forward, 1 reverse gears
Weight (combat load)	10.8 t
Power/weight	19.4 hp/t
Ground pressure	0.53 kg/cm²
Maximum speed	road: 64 km/h (40 mph) water: 6 km/h (3.7 mph)
Average cross-country speed	not available
Acceleration 0-20 mph	12.0 seconds
Operating range	320 km (199 mi)

=== M577A1 ===
The initial upgraded version based upon the M113A1, introduced in 1964. The gasoline engine was replaced with a more powerful diesel engine, providing better fuel economy and a greater operating range, as well as the reducing the fire hazard of gasoline fuel. Specifications and performance are as follows:

Engine	Detroit Diesel 6V-53; 5.2L V6 2-stroke diesel 212 hp (158 kW) @2800rpm
Transmission	Allison TX-100-1; 3 forward, 1 reverse gears
Weight (combat load)	11.1 t
Power/weight	19.1 hp/t
Ground pressure	0.55 kg/cm²
Maximum speed	road: 61 km/h (38 mph) water: 6 km/h (3.7 mph)
Average cross-country speed	not available
Acceleration 0-20 mph	10.5 seconds
Operating range	480 km (298 mi)

=== M577A2 ===
In 1979, further upgrades were introduced based on the M113A2. Engine cooling was improved by switching the locations of the fan and radiator. Higher-strength torsion bars increased ground clearance, and shock absorbers reduced the effects of ground strikes. Increased weight affected the vehicle's freeboard when afloat, and it was no longer required to be amphibious. (Note: In U.S. Army service, doctrine prohibits amphibious operation other than official training exercises and combat operations.) Four-tube smoke grenade launchers were added on each side of the trimvane on the front of the vehicle.

Specifications and performance are as follows:

Engine	Detroit Diesel 6V-53; 5.2L V6 2-stroke diesel 212 hp (158 kW) @2800rpm
Transmission	Allison TX-100-1; 3 forward, 1 reverse gears
Weight (combat load)	11.5 t
Power/weight	18.4 hp/t
Ground pressure	0.57 kg/cm²
Maximum speed	road: 61 km/h (38 mph) water: 6 km/h (3.7 mph)
Average cross-country speed	27 km/h (17 mph)
Acceleration 0-20 mph	11.7 seconds
Operating range	480 km (298 mi)

=== M577A3 ===
In 1987, further improvements were introduced based upon the Reliability Improved Selected Equipment (RISE) package fitted to the M113A3. This included a yoke for steering instead of laterals (tillers), a more powerful turbocharged engine with a larger alternator increasing output from 100A to 200A, and internal spall liners for improved fragmentation protection for occupants. Weight increased again, and some vehicles were fitted with the larger trimvane from the M113A3 to offset the freeboard issues first encountered with the M577A2.

Specifications and performance are as follows:

Engine	Detroit Diesel 6V-53T; 5.2L V6 2-stroke turbodiesel 275 hp (205 kW) @2800rpm
Transmission	Allison TX-200-4A; 4 forward, 2 reverse gears
Weight (combat load)	12.5 t
Power/weight	22.0 hp/t
Ground pressure	0.61 kg/cm²
Maximum speed	road: 66 km/h (41 mph) water: 6 km/h (3.7 mph)
Average cross-country speed	35 km/h (22 mph)
Acceleration 0-20 mph	8.1 seconds
Operating range	455 km (283 mi)

=== M577A4 ===
The A4 is the next generation modernized version of the M577 command post vehicle production version developed by BAE Systems and in partnership with FNSS. Fitted with upgraded digital systems and communications suites, applique armor and external armored fuel tanks similar to those fitted to the M113A3 on both sides of the rear ramp, freeing up more internal space. An improved version of the 6V53T turbo-diesel engine with power increased to 350 hp (261 kW) is installed, along with an improved '4B' version of the TX-400 automatic transmission. The new vehicle has a maximum capacity of seven personnel: driver, vehicle commander and up to five staff officers or system operators, and can be configured as a Fire Direction Centre Vehicle. Limited in numbers and used as the basis for the M577A4 armored treatment vehicle.

== Variants ==
Like the M113 upon which it is based, there are many variants of the M577 in service, many specific to a particular country's army.

=== Australia ===
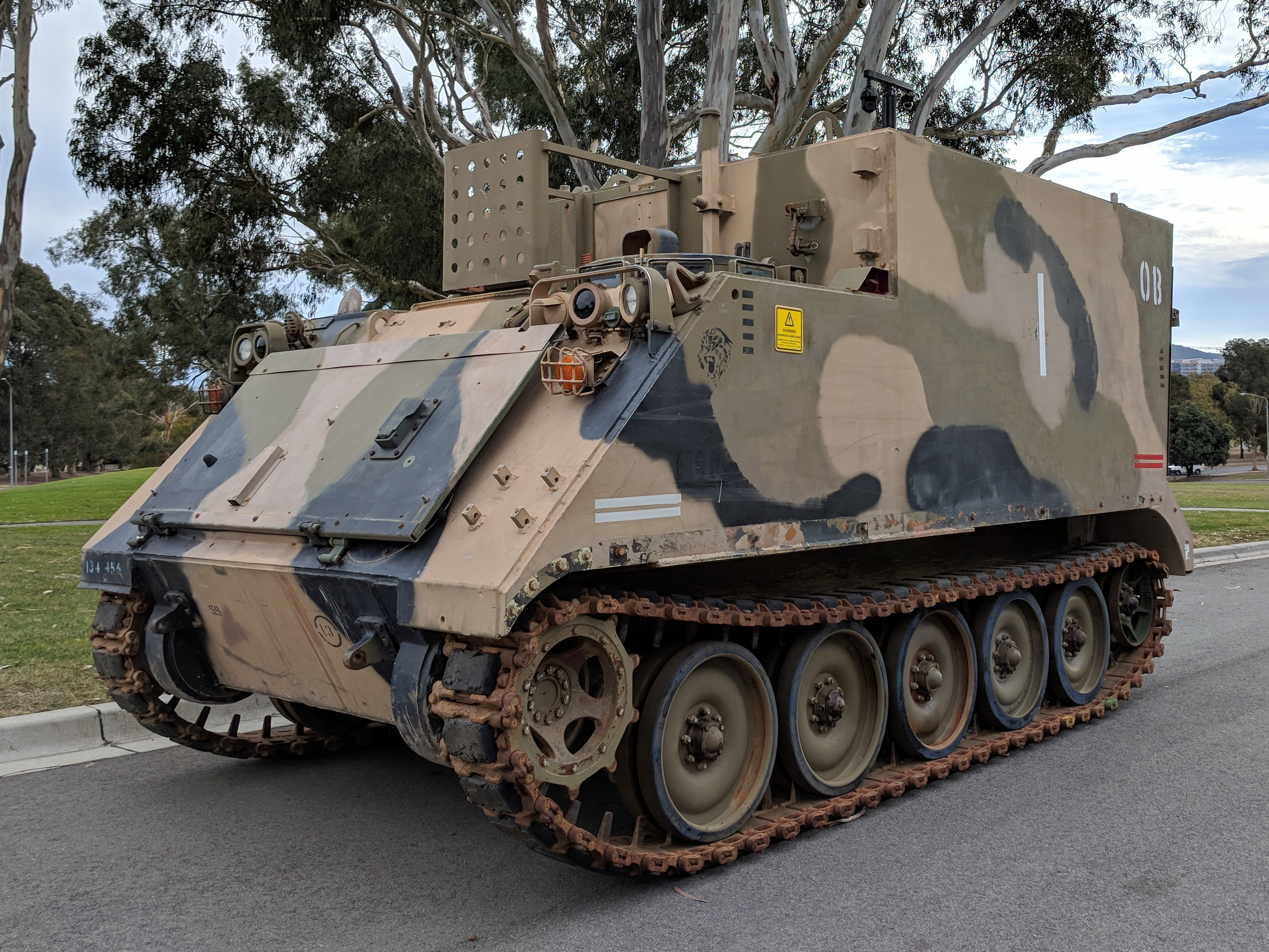
A retired Australian Army M577A1 that forms part of the Australian War Memorial's collection. Note the missing generator from its mounting basket and the missing track shrouds on the sides.

M113AS3 armored command vehicle (ACV)

In 1965 the Australian Army purchased 58 M577A1s in 1965 with some vehicles immediately shipped to Vietnam for operational duty with the 1st APC Troop. Operational experience with the M113A1 showed that vehicles of this family were vulnerable to hull damage from enemy mines, and an indigenous armor upgrade kit (Note: The Australian Army believed the US-designed belly armor upgrade was insufficient for the purpose for which it was designed.) was soon developed and fitted to all vehicles. The upgraded armor consisted of a folded aluminum plate installed under each sponson for the first three road wheels on each side of the vehicle. In 1970, a further 38 mm of aluminum armor was fitted along the entire bottom of the hull, which greatly reduced crew and passenger casualties even from large mines. This armor upgrade package was subsequently fitted to all M577s (and other M113 vehicles) purchased to replace those lost during the war.

In Australian service the M577A1 ACV was originally fitted with both U.S. and British radio sets, reflecting the dual origins of their pieces of major equipment. (Note: In Vietnam. Australia's US-sourced M113s and M577s operated alongside Centurion Mark 5 main battle tanks sourced from Great Britain.) Vehicles would normally carry up to five sets e.g. three AN/GRC-125, one AN/VRC-49 and one AN/GRC-106. AS-1729/VRC antennae were mounted on the vehicle's roof, and an RC-292 antenna could be set up outside the vehicle when it was static to provided significantly more range for the vehicle's radios.

Commencing in 2002 as part of the Land 106 program, the M113 major upgrade project saw 43 M577A1 ACVs upgraded to local AS3 standard and redesignated as the M113AS3 ACV. (Note: Under Land 106, all vehicles from the M113 family in Australian service were redesignated as either an M113AS3 or, if fitted with a stretched 6-axle chassis, M113AS4, with a two to four character suffix designating specific variants; this included the M125A1 Armourmed Mortar Carrier (redesignated as the M113AS3 AM), the M579A1 Fitter's Vehicle (redesignated as the M113AS4 AF) and the M806A1 armored recovery vehicle light (redesignated M113AS3 ARVL).) The upgrade package consisted of:

- MTU 6V199TE 350 hp (261 kW) diesel engine
- ZF LSG 1000 R automatic transmission with 6 forward and 2 reverse gears
- Cooling system capable of operating in 44 °C (111 °F) ambient conditions
- Air conditioning and chilled water dispenser for crew comfort
- Applique armor and spall liners for improved crew protection
- Yoke steering with pivot turn capability
- Upgraded suspension
- Twin-caliper disc brakes with dual hydraulic system and separate mechanical handbrake
- Digital communication suite

M113AS3 armored ambulance

The Australian Army also operated a number of M577A1 armored ambulances, which effectively serve as both emergency treatment and evacuation vehicles. As part of the M113 major upgrade project, 15 of these vehicles were converted to a similar AS3 standard as the ACV and redesignated as the M113AS3 armored ambulance.

=== Canada ===
TLAV-CP (Note: M113-based vehicles in Canadian service previously used the base designation LAV-T for "light armored vehicle, tracked", and the M577A2 command post vehicle was the LAV-T/CP. As a result of the M113 life extension project (implemented 1 April 2000 to 31 March 2007), in which the vehicles were upgraded from the A2 to the A3 standard, they were redesignated as TLAV (tracked light armored vehicle) so as to differentiate them from the 6- and 8-wheeled LAVs in service.)

Based on the M577A3 command post vehicle, 23 vehicles were in service with the Canadian Army. Nicknamed the 'Queen Mary', the vehicle is equipped with an upgraded communications suite. Externally, additional stowages are mounted on the vehicle's roof, along with removable antenna masts. At the front of the vehicle a stowage basket is attached to the engine cover in place of the trim vane, and cable cutters were mounted at each side. A transparent perspex shield was often fitted in front of the driver's hatch for Arctic operations. Snow hawsers and spiked "ice cleats" were carried on external mountings. From 2001, the Diehl 213G steel tracks were replaced by Soucy rubber band tracks for quieter operation on roads and better operation on snow and ice.

=== Germany ===
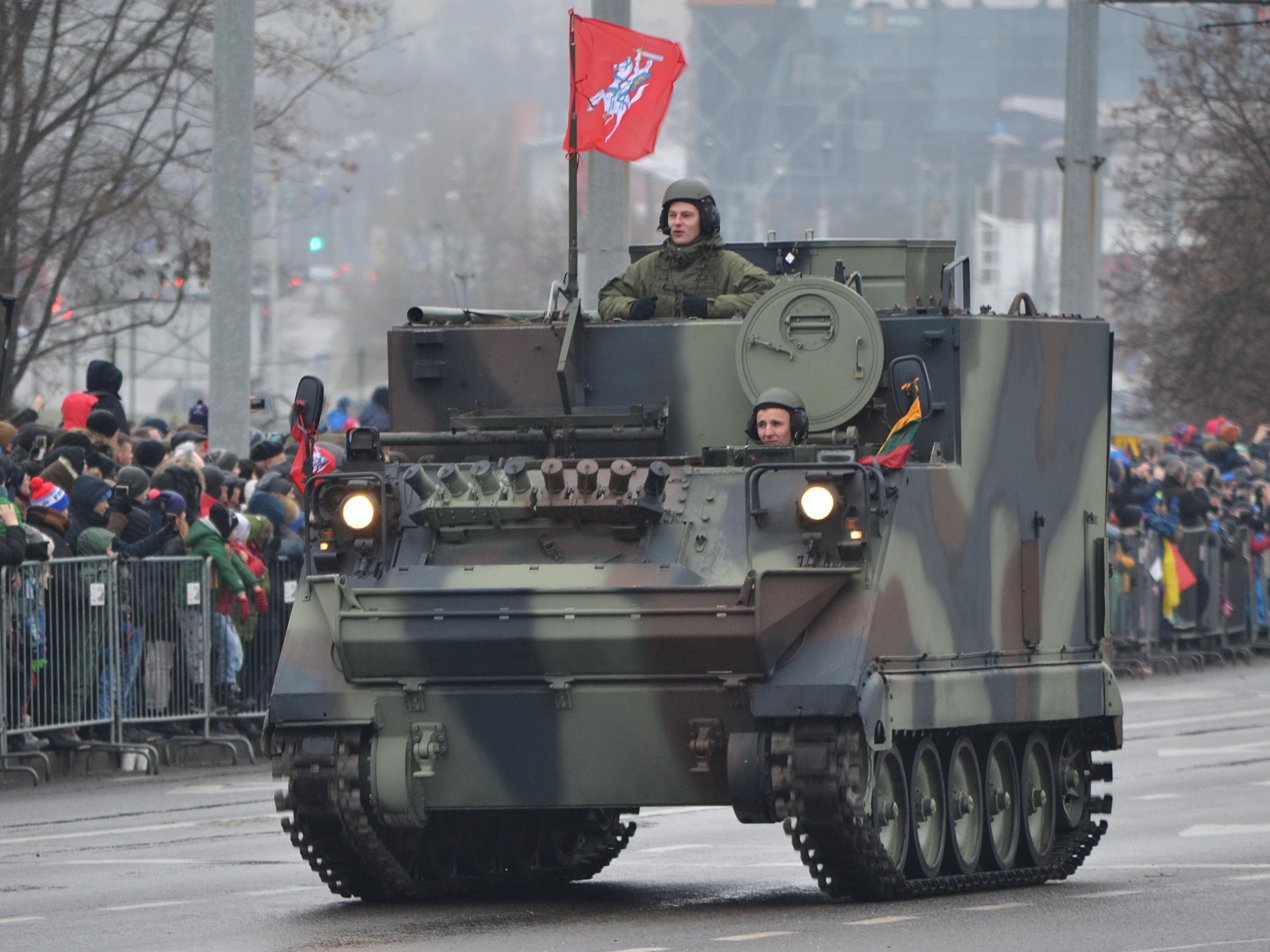
Former German M577GA2 GefStdPz in Lithuanian service. The APU and mounting basket have been removed.

M577G GefStdPz

In German service, the M577 and M577A1 received different fire extinguishing and heating systems, modified periscopes and SEM 25/30 radios, and were known as the M577G and M577GA1 Gefechtsstandspanzer(GefStdPz) . In the late 1980s M577GA1s were upgraded to A2 standard and were designated M577GA2. These vehicles operated in four different roles:

- air liaison
- command and control
- information gathering
- printed communications (teletype equipped)

Vehicles received further upgrades under the Nutzungsdauerverlängerung (NDV) program (Note: As the M577GA2 weighed under 12.5 tons, they did not receive the more powerful MTU 6V 183TC 22 diesel engine and ZF transmission fitted to other German vehicles of the M113 family.) consisting of:

- dual-circuit braking system with mechanical handbrake
- new driving and steering dashboards
- SEM 80/90 radios
- Diehl 513 tracks

The M112GA2 is distinguished from U.S. and other NATO M577s stationed in Germany by the following external features:

- stowage basket fitted to the front replacing the trim vane
- a row of eight 76mm smoke grenade dischargers located between the front stowage basket and the top of the hull
- changes to the front light clusters consisting of a large main driving light, a smaller dimmed night driving light and indicators
- rear vision mirrors on each front corner to aid the driver
- different rear light clusters
- the APU mounted on the front of the upper hull is offset to the right

=== Israel ===
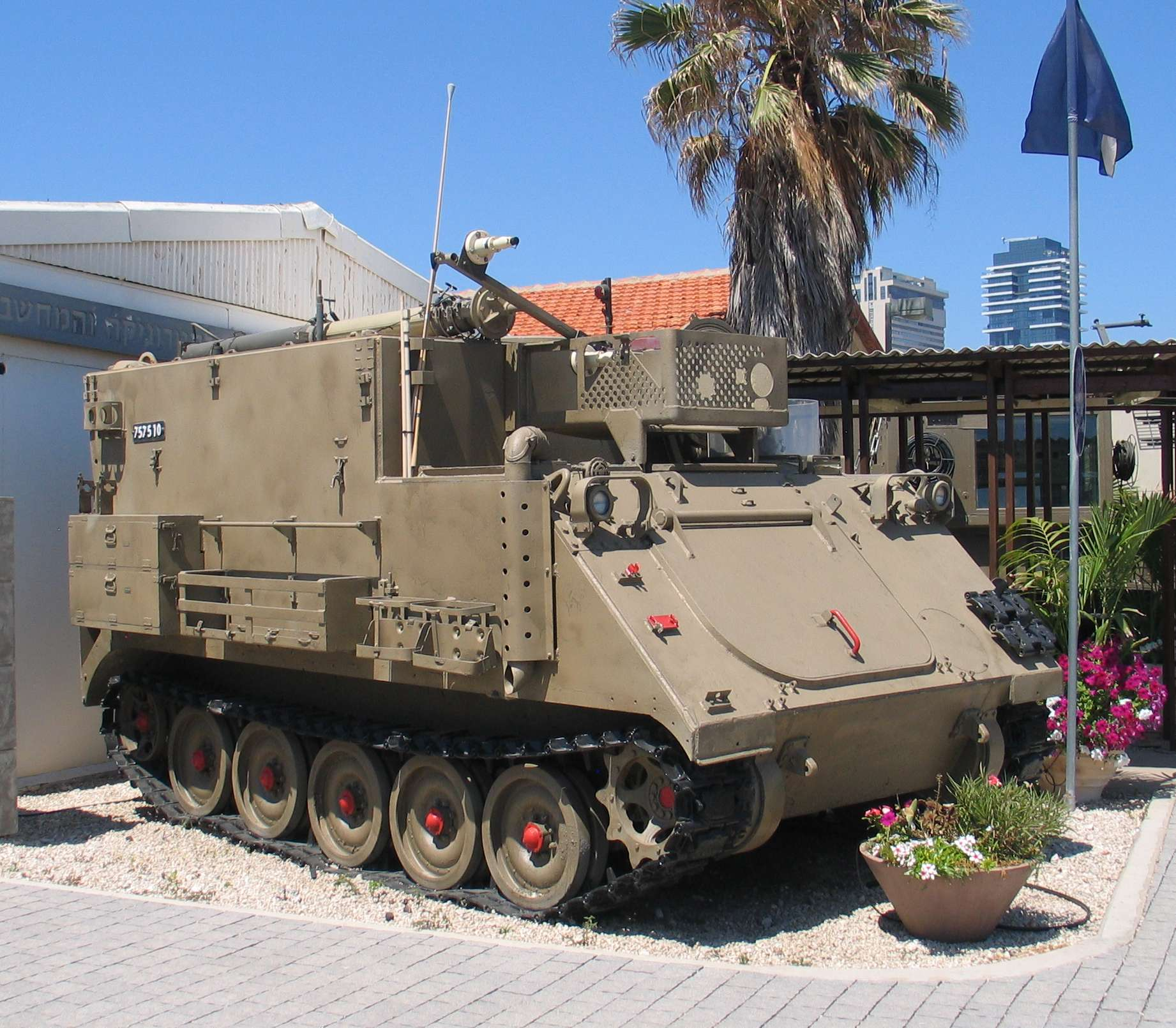
IDF M577 Mugaf

Mugaf

Israeli designation of the M577 command post carrier. Vehicles are equipped with external stowages and storage racks along the hull sides, similar to those seen on IDF M579 Fitter's vehicles.

=== Norway ===
NM196

The NM196 Hjelpeplasspanservogn was the medical treatment version of M577A2. This vehicle saw the following upgrades during its service life:

- NM196F1: fitted with interior spall liners.
- NM196F3: F1 upgrade plus upgrades to the driveline, caterpillar diesel engine, add-on armor and redesigned interior and treatment facilities.

NM198

The NM198 Kommandopanservogn was the local variant of the M577A2 command post vehicle. This vehicle saw the following upgrade(s) during its service life:

- NM198F1: fitted with interior spall liners.

=== South Korea ===
K277

Developed in the 1980s, the K277 is a locally produced version of the M577A1 command post vehicle featuring a different engine and transmission – a MAN D2848T V8 diesel engine made under licence by Doosan and Allison X200-5K automatic transmission. The upper and lower hull of the vehicle is fitted with a layer of spaced laminate steel armor similar to that fitted to the K200 IFV which provides increased ballistic protection as well as extra buoyancy. The front of the vehicle is fitted with the armored trim vane from the K2000. Vehicles are usually armed with a Browning M2 HB 12.7mm heavy machine gun. The K277A1 is an upgraded version with a more powerful engine and transmission, NBC protection and an automatic fire extinguishing system. With the additional armor and other changes, the K277 is heavier than the M577.

=== Taiwan ===
CM-26 command track

Commencing service with the Republic of China Army in 1982, the CM-26 command track is a locally built variant based upon the M577A2 that shares key components from the CM-21A1 armored infantry fighting vehicle. Unlike the CM-21A1, which varies extensively (it resembles the armored infantry fighting vehicle (AIFV)) from the M113A2 upon which it is based, changes to the CM-26 are mostly limited to its engine and transmission. The vehicle is fitted with a 248 hp (185 kW) (Note: Some sources quote the output of this engine at 210-215hp, but this is the output of the non-turbocharged variant of this engine as fitted to the original CM-21. The CN-26 and other variants of the CM-21 are based upon the upgraded CM-21A1 which features the turbo-charged TV8.640 and this engine appears to now be used across all variants within this family of vehicles. i.e. older vehicles had their engines upgraded to the more powerful turbo-charged engine.) Perkins TV8.640 turbo-diesel which provides significantly more power than the 212 hp (158 kW) of the Detroit Diesel 6V-53 fitted to the M113A2/M577A12. (Note: The extra power was required as the CM-21A1 is heavier than the M113A2) The engine is coupled to a locally built automatic transmission developed by Taiwans' Industrial Technology Research Institute and is similar to the Allison TX-200-1 fitted to the M113A1/M577A1 and features four forward and one reverse gears. (Note: Some sources for the CM-21 state the vehicle's transmission is the Allison TX-100-1, but this is the transmission fitted to the M577A2 and only features three forward and one reverse gears.) The vehicle is also fitted with night vision driving aids, NBC protection, improved communications suite and other minor changes.

=== United States ===
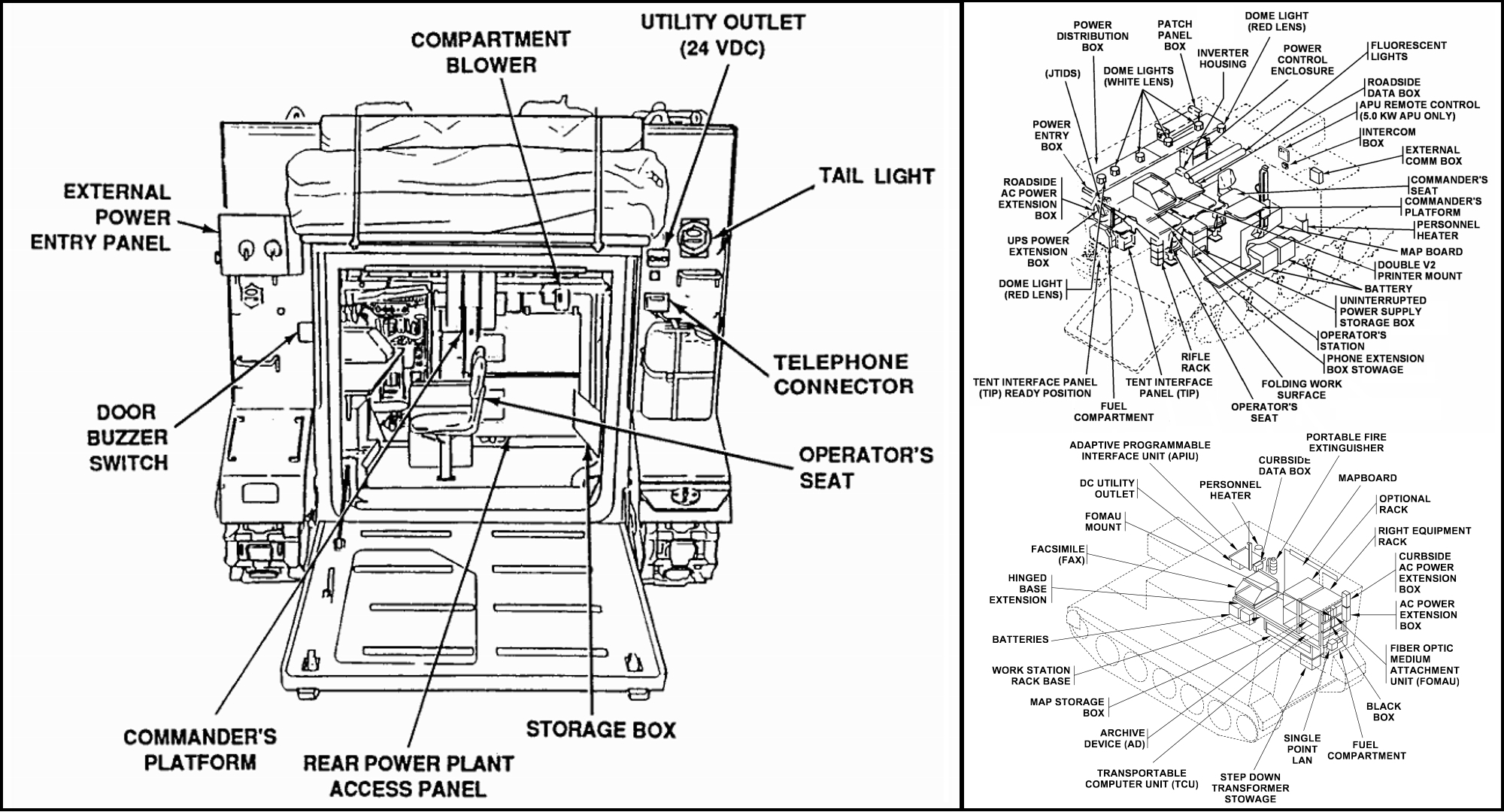
M1068A3 SICPS rear view and interior layout

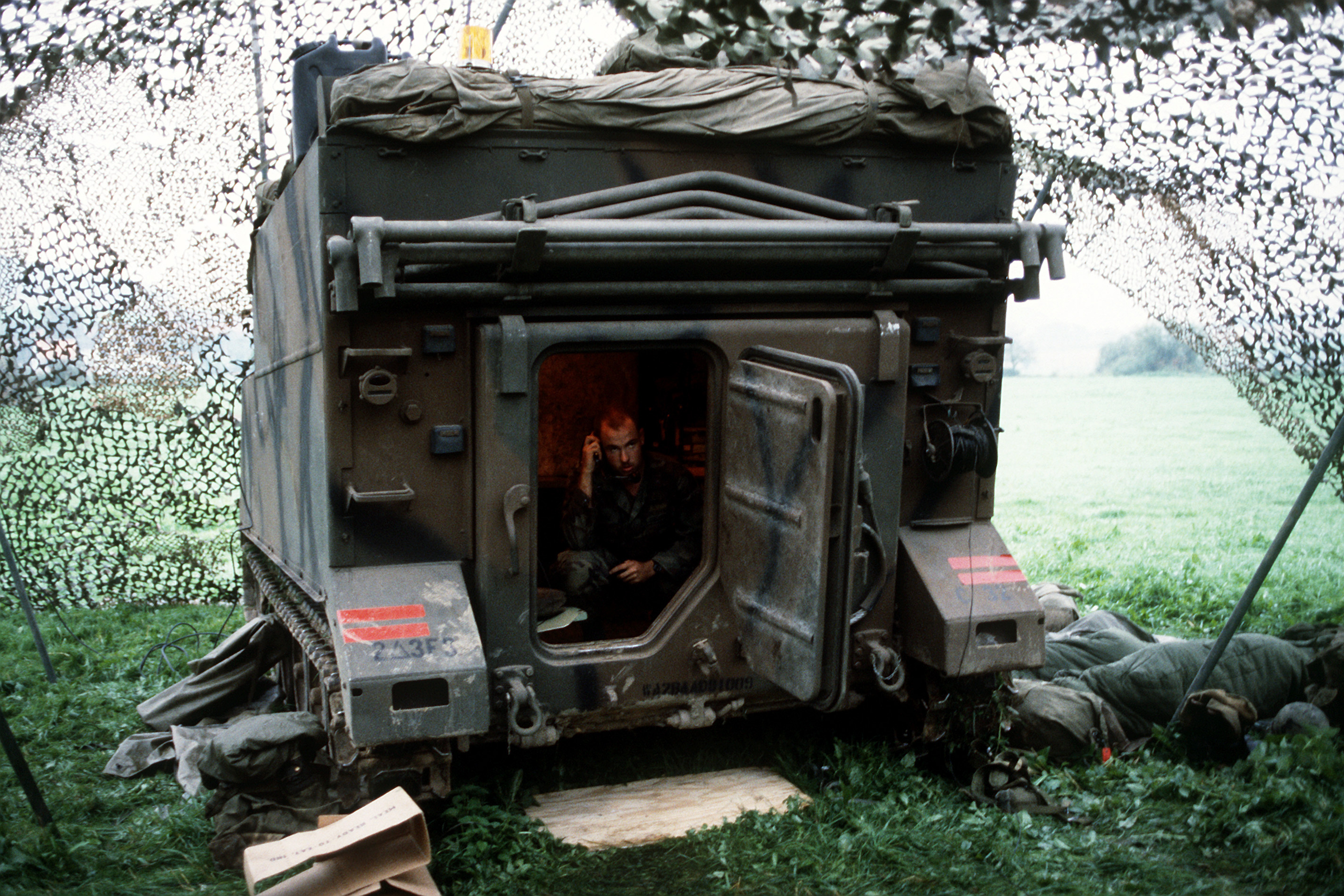
A rear view of an M577 vehicle under camouflage netting during Exercise REFORGER '85. A soldier inside the vehicle uses a radio headset.

- M577/A1 battalion aid station: early nomenclature for emergency treatment vehicles, but appears to be a description of the role in which the vehicles operated rather than an official designation.
- M577/A1 armored ambulance: early nomenclature for emergency evacuation vehicles, but appears to be a description of the role in which the vehicles operated rather than an official designation.
- M577A2/3 emergency medical treatment vehicle: standardized and officially designated emergency evacuation vehicle (i.e. armored ambulances) based on A2 and later A3 upgrades.
- M577A2E2: featuring a chassis lengthened by 34 inches and fitted with an extra road wheel on each side (for a total of six). First developed in 1988, as at 2007 it is still a prototype.
- M577A4 armored treatment vehicle: recent upgrade to the M577A3 Emergency Medical Treatment Vehicle. Limited numbers.
- M1068 standard integrated command post system (SICPS) carrier: following the 1991 Gulf War approximately two-thirds of the U.S. Army's inventory of M577A2 vehicles were fitted with the new army tactical command and control system (ATCCS) and redesignated as the M1068. Externally, the new vehicles are identical to the M577 but featured many internal changes, including:
  - digital communication suite including GPS and "blue force" tracking
  - power/data distribution system
  - new stowages and equipment racks, including for computers
  - 220/240V AC power inverters for COTS computer equipment
  - seating for two operators (crew is reduced from five to four from M577A2)
  - later fitted with upgraded 5 kW 180A 28V DC diesel generator (as fitted to M577A3)
  - also features a 10 m (33 ft) antenna and a new tent, the Modular Command Post System, which can also be used as a stand-alone command post.
- M1068A3 SICPS: M1068 upgraded to M577A3 standard featuring the RISE engine and transmission upgrade package. (Note: Some sources erroneously list this vehicle as the M1068A1 as it was the first upgrade of the base model. However, the base model was already equivalent to the M577A2, and the A3 descriptor is standardized nomenclature for M113-based vehicles fitted with the RISE package.) Vehicles not upgraded to A3 standard were redesignated as M1068 (Basic),

== Operators ==
=== Military ===
==== Current operators ====
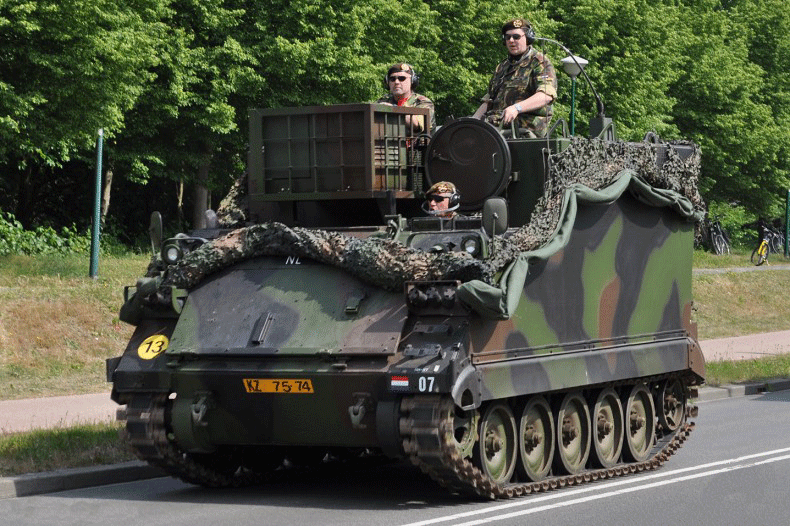
M577A1 of the Royal Netherlands Army. Some of these vehicles were later sold to Bahrain.

- Afghanistan: in 2005 the Afghan National Army received 15 second-hand M577A2 vehicles from the U.S.
- Argentina: in 1967 the Argentine Army received 10 10 M577A1 command post vehicles, and a further 10 in 1992.
- Australia: the Australian Army operated a fleet of up to 70 M577A1s used as command post vehicles and armored ambulances. For those mechanized/motorized units whereby the M113A1 APC and other variants have been replaced by the ASLAV family of vehicles, the M577A1 has been replaced by the ASLAV armored command vehicle. Between June 2002 and September 2012, under the M113 major upgrade project, 43 M577A1 armored command vehicles and 15 M577A1 armored ambulances were upgraded and re-designated the M113AS3 armored command vehicles and M113AS3 armored ambulances respectively. These vehicles are due to be replaced from 2025 with the equivalent variant(s) of a new infantry fighting vehicle under Phase 3 of the Land 400 program.
- Bahrain: operates three (3) M577A1 sourced from the Netherlands and fifteen (15) M577A2 sourced from the U.S.
- Brazil: in 2015 Brazil negotiated with the U.S. through the Foreign Military Sales program the purchase of up to 200 surplus M577A2 vehicles. As at October 2018, 124 vehicles have been delivered. In September 2020, the U.S. donated a further 20 vehicles. The vehicles will operate in the roles of ambulance, command centre and communications.
- Canada: as at 2015 the Canadian Army were operating 33 M577A3 command post vehicles which are scheduled to be replaced by the LAV 6.0 armoured combat support vehicle between 2020 and 2025.
- Egypt: between 1980 and 2002 the Egyptian Army purchased 280 M577s from the U.S.
- Greece: the Hellenic Army operates 249 M577A2 command post vehicles. Many units were purchased second-hand from the U.S.
- Israel: known as the Mugaf in Israeli service, vehicles are equipped with external stowages and storage racks along the hull sides, similar to those seen on IDF M579 Fitter's vehicles.
- Jordan: in February 2018 Jordan received 180 surplus M577A3 command post vehicles donated by the U.S. Army
- Kuwait: the Kuwait Army operates 30 M577 command post vehicles, mostly M577A1s. Following the 1991 Gulf War a number of M577A3s were purchased from the U.S. to replace vehicles destroyed by Iraqis forces.
- Lebanon: the Lebanese Army and the Republican Guard operate the M577A1. Some of these vehicles may have been captured from Israel during the 1982 and 2006 wars.
- Lithuania: in 2016 the Lithuanian Land Forces purchased 168 second-hand M577s from Germany. The vehicles are used in the roles of command, indirect fire support, medical evacuation and training.
- Norway: in 2018 FFG of Germany won the contract for the supply of the new armored combat support vehicle (ACSV), based on their protected mission module carrier (PMMC) G5. As part of this contract, the Norwegian Army's fleet of NM196 and NM198 vehicles (local variants of the M577A2) will be modernized, including upgrading the engine and transmission to the company's G4 power pack consisting of a MTU 6V199 TE2 turbo-diesel and ZF LSG 1000 HD transmission.
- Portugal: the Portuguese Army has received a total of 47 M577A2 vehicles of which 39 are in service; 36 command post vehicles and 3 ambulances.
- Saudi Arabia: in 1984 the Royal Saudi Land Forces purchased an unknown number of M57712 command post vehicles from the U.S., followed by an additional purchase of M577A3 versions in 1994. Commencing 2015, all vehicles were upgraded to A4 specification as part of a modernisation program for their entire fleet of M113-derived vehicles. As at June 2017, an unknown number of these vehicles remained in service.
- South Korea: the Republic of Korea Army operates the K277A1, a locally-built version of the M577A1 command post vehicle.
- Taiwan: the Republic of China Army operates the CM-26 command track, a locally-built version of the M577A2 command post vehicle.
- Ukraine: Portugal has given two M577 vehicles to Ukraine. Lithuania donate M577 armored personnel carrier to Ukraine At least 35 units were lost during the war as of July 2025.
- United States: the U.S. Army operates large numbers and many variants of the M577, most upgraded to A3 specification. Commencing September 2020, these vehicles are scheduled for replaced by equivalent variants of the Armored Multi-Purpose Vehicle.
- Yemen: as of 2015, the Republic of Yemen Armed Forces operated six M577A1 command post vehicles, with one vehicle assigned to each of its six mechanized brigades. With the on-going war in that country, the current status of these vehicles is unknown.

==== Former operators ====
- Germany: commencing 2011, all M577GA2 vehicles were phased out of service, replaced by the command variant of the Boxer wheeled AFV. Many of these surplus vehicles were later sold to Lithuania.
- Italy: the Italian Army operated an unknown number of M577s, mostly command vehicles as well as some ambulances. Most were locally built (by OTO Melara) and early production units featured two-piece hull sides. All vehicles have been replaced by command variants of the Freccia IFV.
- Netherlands: operated the M577A1 command post vehicle where it was nicknamed Bakkerskar (baker's car). Replaced by the command and control variant of the CV90. A small number of these surplus vehicles were sold to Bahrain.
- New Zealand: M577A1 command post vehicle replaced by the command and control variant of the Pinzgauer High-Mobility All-Terrain Vehicle.
- Spain: in the 1970s the Spanish Army equipped numerous battlegroups (e.g. CWSP-05, CWSP-06, etc) within its armored and cavalry brigades with M577A1 command post vehicles. Although some of these vehicles were replaced with the BMR-PC Armored Command Vehicle in the mid 1980s, as at 2003 an unknown number of these vehicles remained in service. However, it appears that by 2010 all remaining vehicles had been retired from service.

=== Law enforcement ===
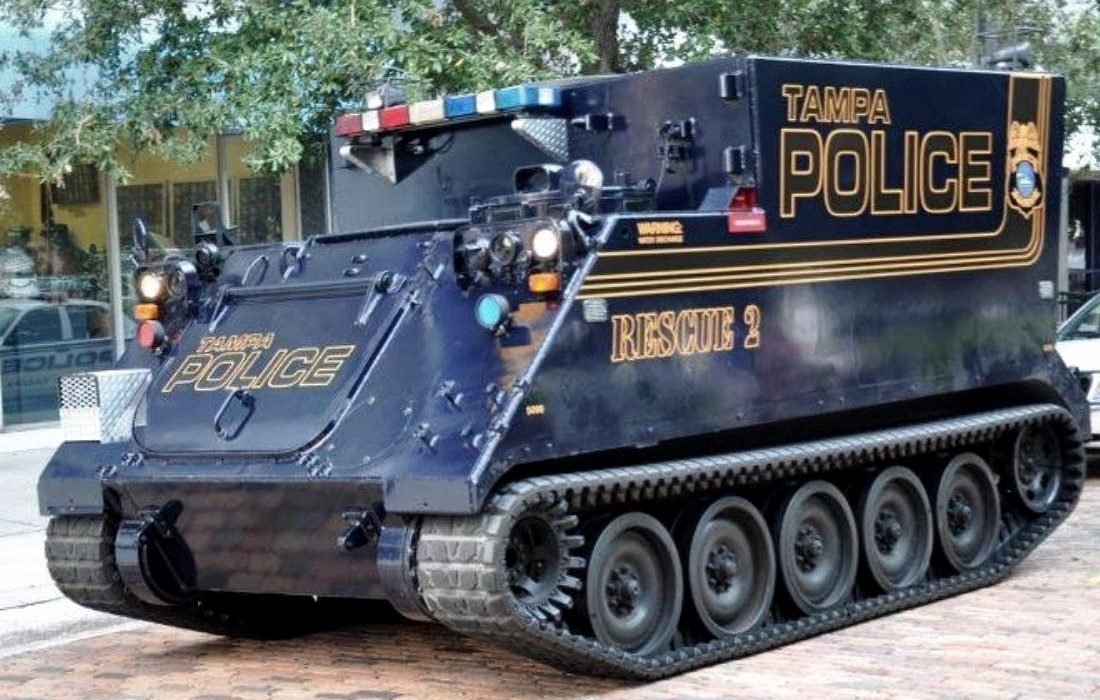
M577 rescue vehicle of the Tampa Police Department, Florida

The M577 has been adopted by various police forces and law enforcement agencies (mostly in the U.S. (Note: U.S. law enforcement agencies were able to obtain surplus military equipment free of charge under the LESO 1033 program for the "war on drugs".)) as a tactical response or hostage rescue vehicle. Agencies that use the vehicle in this role include:

- Calhoun County Sheriff's Office (Iowa)
- Lakeland Police Department (Florida)
- Macomb County Sheriff's Office (Michigan)
- Tampa Police Department (Florida)

=== Civilian ===
==== NASA ====
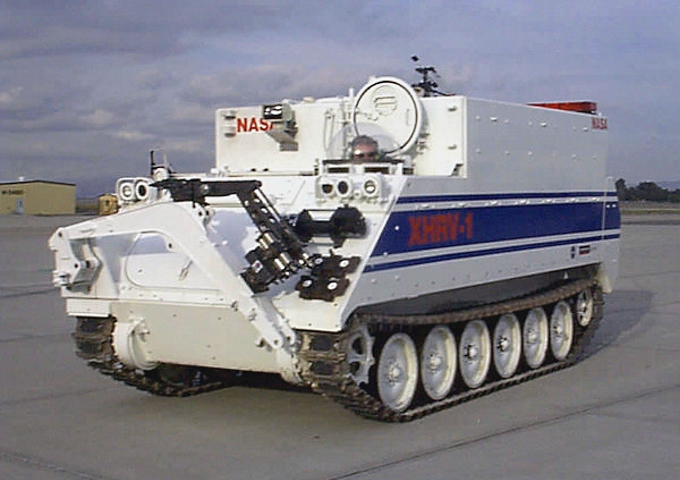
NASA XHRV-1 experimental hazardous material response vehicle

Between 1994 and 1997, NASA (who operated four M113A2 Armored Rescue Vehicles up to the end of the Space Shuttle program) trialled the eXperimental HAZMAT Response Vehicle (XHRV-1), a modified M577A3 specifically designed for dealing with HAZMAT incidents i.e. emergency incidents involving hazardous materials. The vehicle, on loan from FMC, was a collaboration between NASA and the Ames Research Center, and featured an extended 6-axle chassis similar to that of the M577A2E2, as well as external fuel tanks similar to those fitted to the M113A3.

At the front was a manipulator arm for use with the hazardous materials. The driver's hatch was replaced with a transparent polycarbonate dome, and the vehicle was hermetically sealed and fitted with an overpressure air conditioning system. The APU, normally attached to the front of the upper hull to the right of the driver, was removed. At the rear the cargo ramp was replaced with two sealed "suit ports", attached to each was a HAZMAT suit so that personnel could enter and exit the vehicle without being exposed to the hazardous materials. In addition to the vehicle's driver and commander, the rear cargo/personnel area was fitted with seating and workstations for four operators. On the roof of the upper hull was a "robotic miniature helicopter" (i.e. a drone) fitted with stereoscopic cameras and environmental sensors, which was remotely controlled from inside the vehicle. In conceptual artwork the roof featured another transparent polycarbonate dome to provide external visual access to the operators, but this was not implemented on the actual vehicle.

Only one prototype vehicle was built and is now on public display (repainted as a military ambulance) at Eagle Field in California.

== Similar vehicles ==
- AIFV command post vehicle (AIFV-B-CP)
- LAV command and control vehicle (LAV-C2)
- M4 command and control vehicle (M4 C2V)
- M1130 commander's vehicle
- YPR-765 PRCO-C armored command post vehicle
