= Modular Command Post System =

Military tent system

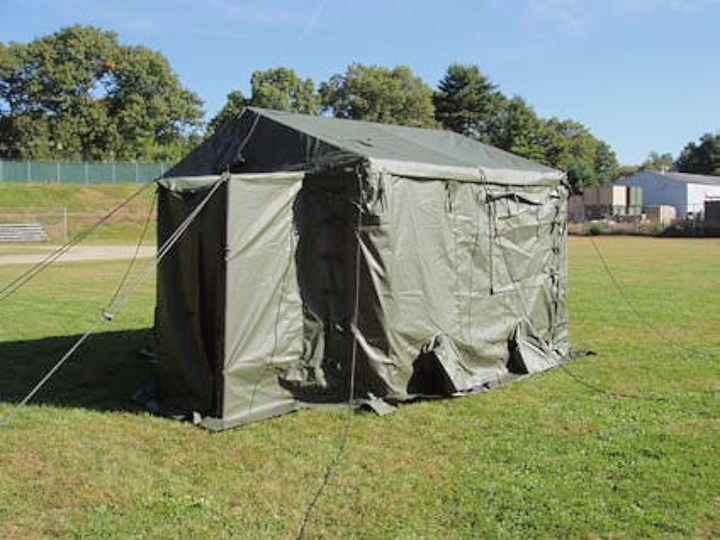
Modular Command Post System (MCPS) tent, Type 3 (green)

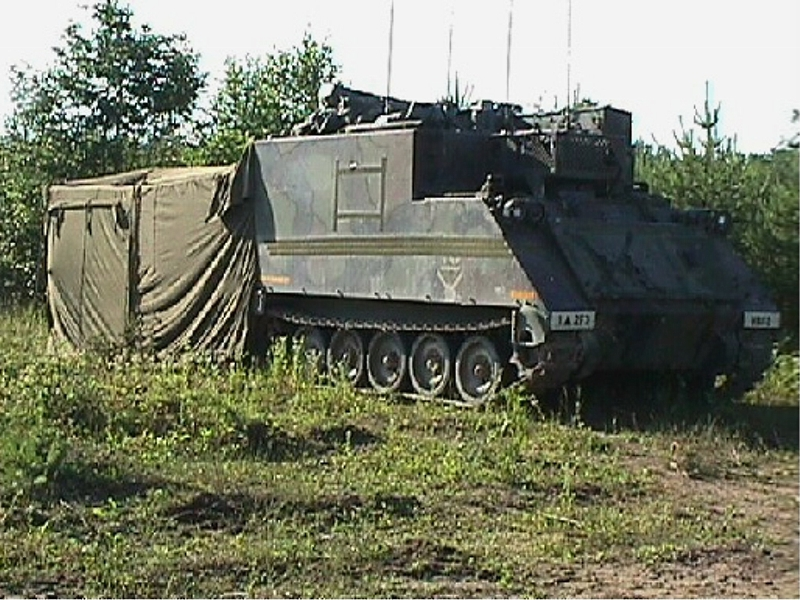
A M577 command post carrier with a MCPS tent

The Modular Command Post System (MCPS) is a modular tent system for mobile or temporary tactical operations centers, developed in the early-mid 1990s by the United States Army. The tents are designed to be utilised as a free-standing shelter. When used with a bootwall, it can be attached to other types of U.S. Army shelters and tactical vehicles such as variants of the HMMWV (Humvee).

== Overview ==
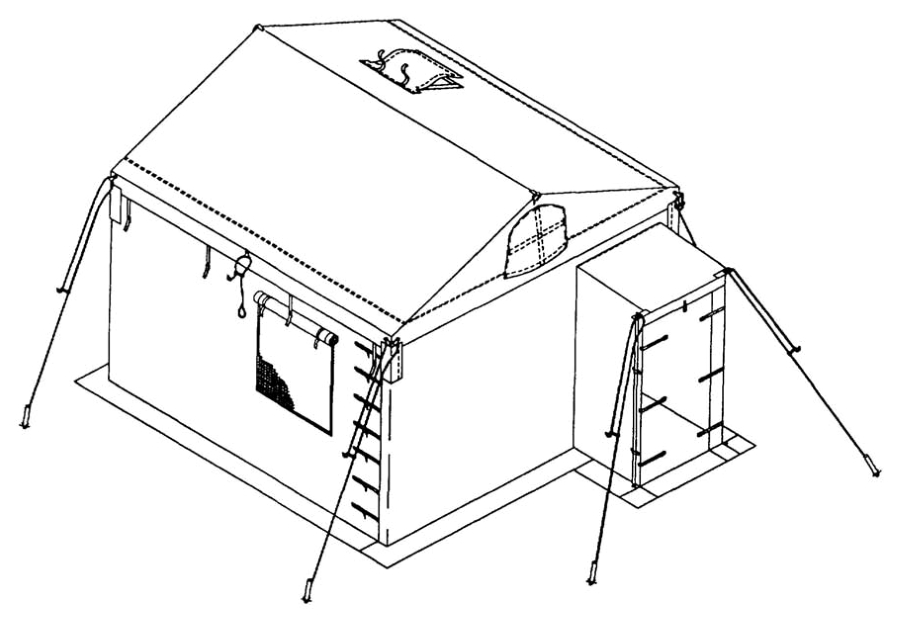
Figure 1: MCPS Type 1 tent

The MCPS is a modular, configurable system utilising standardised interchangeable components that allow the easy transportation, erection and dismantling of a variety of temporary structures. They are suitable for deployment in a number of climates, and provide blackout protection for use within forward deployed areas. MCPS tents are available in two colours, camouflage green and desert tan.

Each "unit", i.e. the set of components that comprise one tent, can be configured as:

- single stand-alone structure [Figure 1]
- complex structures comprising multiple MCPS units connected together
- extension structures attached to tactical vehicles

When erected, individual MCPS units measure 11 ft (3.35 m) by 11 ft (3.35 m). They are secured to the ground using guy lines and tent pegs. When not in use, units are packed in a dedicated packing containers, which are strapped to a wooden pallet for storage and transportation.

== Design ==
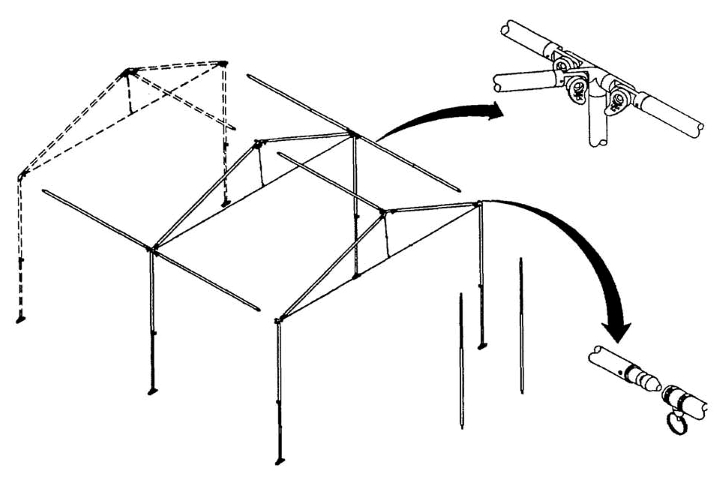
Figure 2: MCPS tent frame assembly

=== Tent ===
Each MCPS tent comprises four exterior fabric walls of identical dimensions that can be arranged as desired. Wall sections are suspended from the roof with a series of male/female quick-connect fasteners, as well as strips of hook and loop fasteners (i.e. velcro). The roof contains two ventilation vents and a stove pipe opening. Walls are available with or without ECU/SHC ducts.

A covered entry way is an integral part of the entrance wall and provides environmental protection and aids good light discipline. When two or more tents are joined together, a rain gutter connects between tents to help water run off. Eight 12-inch steel tent pins (pegs) are issued per unit for staking down the tent frame leg assemblies. Eight 24-inch wooden tent pins are issued for staking down the tent guys lines.

The system is designed for ease of assembly and minimal labour requirement, utilising quick release fasteners and fixtures throughout. The design distributes loads efficiently, with lighter support systems than conventional tents and comprises:

- common roof cover
- three collapsible sections – the entrance wall frame, centre wall frame and end wall frame – made of aluminium tube that unfold and connect to form a single frame [Figure 2]. Frame poles are telescopically height-adjustable for sloping ground.
- interchangeable sidewalls to form different configurations. Types of sidewalls include:
  - plain walls
  - window walls
  - entrance walls
  - bootwalls

Erection (set-up) and dismantlement (strike-down) of MCPS units can be accomplished by two persons, with quoted set-up and strike-down times of 20 and 15 minutes respectively.

==== Optional components ====
Light coloured wall liners can be fitted to the inside of walls to aide light diffusion and provide basic insulation. They can also be used as outside walls during warm weather and during daylight. Wall liners are either:

- plain for use with plain walls (i.e. no openings)
- with openings for use with window walls
- with openings for use with entrance walls (can also be used with window walls)

Insulated wall liners are also available for in extreme operating conditions. A light coloured floor can be laid and attached to the walls with a series of male/female quick-connect fasteners.

=== Bootwalls ===
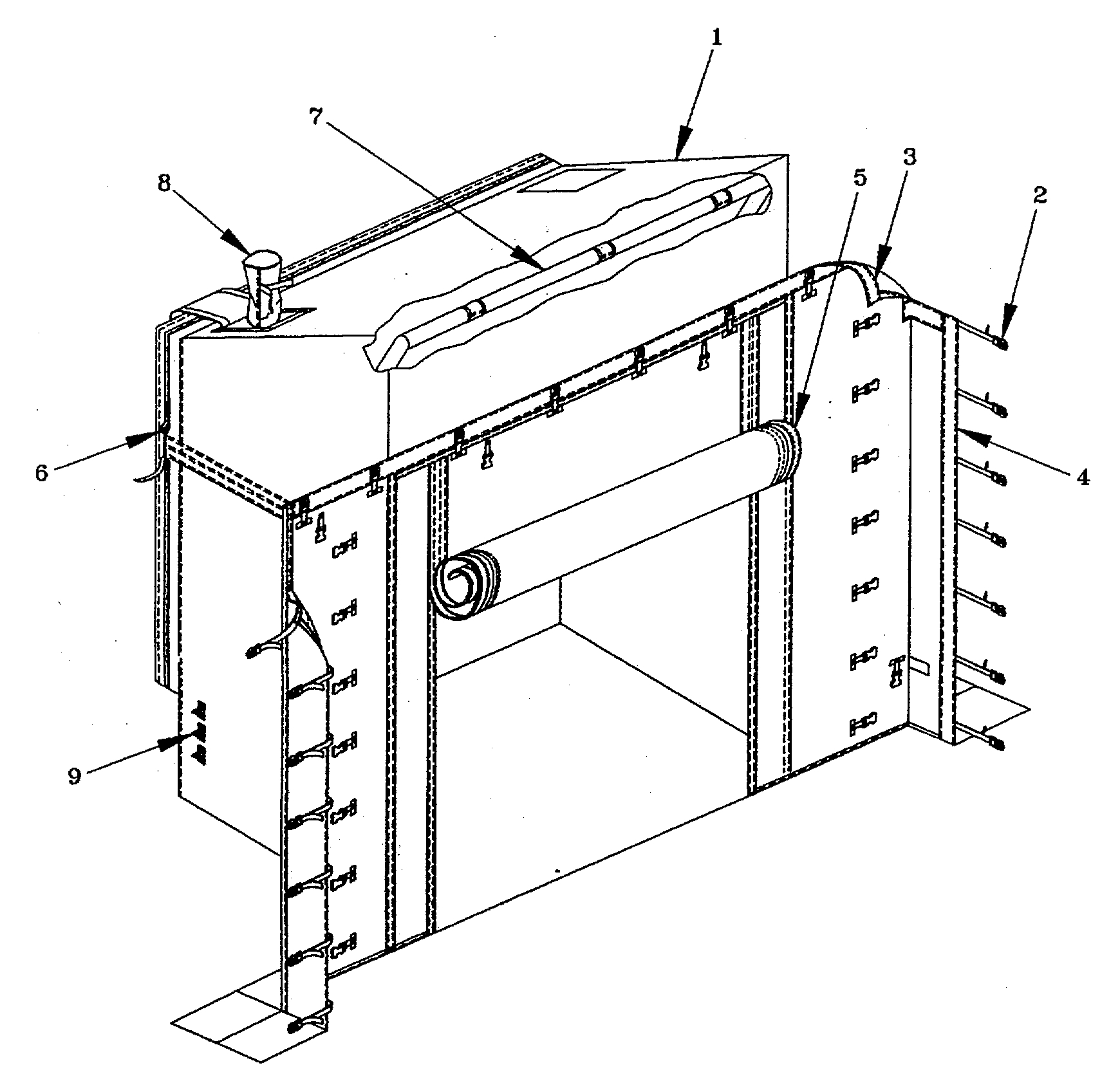
Figure 3: MCPS RWS bootwall

Bootwalls are the means by which an MCPS tent is connected to another type of shelter or a tactical vehicle. [Figure 3] depicts a rigid wall shelter (RWS) bootwall for which the components are as follows:

1. Polyester bootwall
2. Quick-release fasteners
3. Hook and loop (Velcro) fastener tapes
4. Bootwall end panel
5. Roll-up fabric door
6. Adjustable RWS belly band
7. U-frame (rigid)
8. Antenna sleeves
9. Securing loops for attaching guy lines

Like the MCPS tents, bootwalls are available in both Camouflage Green ("Class I") and Desert Tan ("Class II").

=== Packaging ===
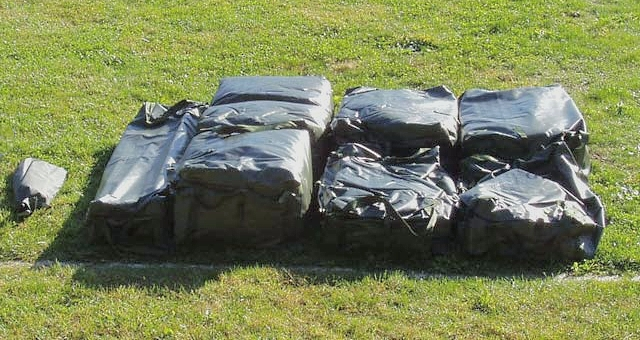
MCPS tent packed for transportation

MCPS components are supplied and shipped in dedicated packing bags. Three different types of bags are required for each MCPS unit:

- Fabric Transport Bag: constructed of a coated cloth material, it is approximately 36 inches (91 centimetres) long, 26 inches (66 centimetres) wide and 15 inches (38 centimetres) high when packed. Three pairs of male/female quick-connect fasteners are located along the sides approximately 14 inches (36 centimetres) apart, as well as another pair at each end with 2 inch (5 cm) strips of hook and loop fasteners (i.e. velcro). A carrying handle is located at each end and an identification label is sewn on the inside of the bag. "TENT BAG" is stencilled on the side along with a weight limit. Two bags are required for each MCPS unit.
- Frame Transport Bag: constructed of a coated cloth material, it is approximately 70 inches (180 centimetres) long, 19 inches (48 centimetres) wide and 9 inches (23 centimetres) high when packed. Four pairs of male/female quick-connect fasteners are located along the sides approximately 15.5 inches apart, as well as another pair at each end with 2 inch (5 cm) strips of hook and loop fasteners (i.e. velcro). A carrying handle is located at each end and an identification label is sewn on the inside of the bag along with simplified assembly instructions. "FRAME BAG" is stencilled on the side along with a weight limit. One bag is required for each MCPS unit.
- Tent Pin Bag: constructed of a polyester cloth and approximately 37.5 inches (95 centimetres) long and 15.5 inches (39 centimetres) wide when packed. The bag is secured with tie straps, and one bag is required for each MCPS unit.

Once packed, the bags can be strapped to a standard wooden pallet for storage or transportation.

=== Operational equipment ===
MCPS units can be fitted with standardised command post equipment of:

- lighting set (75.5 in × 12.5 in × 5.5 in (192 cm × 32 cm × 14 cm))
- mapboard (62 in × 25 in × 1.5 in (157 cm × 64 cm × 4 cm))
- table (27.5 in × 24 in × 21 in (70 cm × 61 cm × 53 cm))

Lighting sets and mapboards are suspended from the tent frame.

== Variants ==
MCPS tents are available in two different types:

=== Type I ===
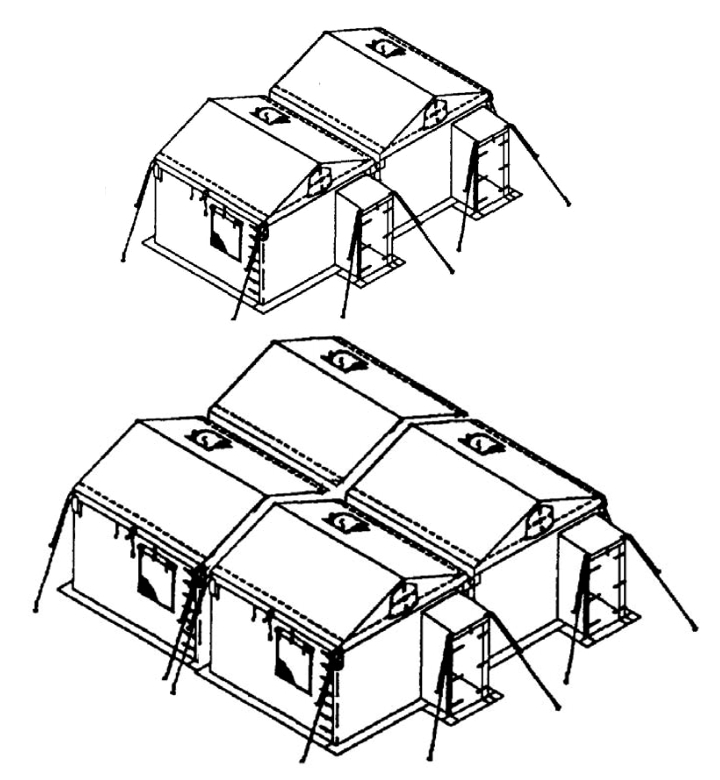
Figure 4: Examples of multiple MCPS tents. Each MCPS tent can be connected to one or more MCPS tents.

The Type I MCPS is the original design equipped with uninsulated wall liners only, and does not have provisions to accommodate a convective space heater (SHC) or ECU ducts. Door openings are offset from the centre, and are fitted with a standard TEMPER vestibule. Type I units are free-standing only i.e. they cannot be attached to vehicles or structures others than other MCPS tents, to which they be attached together to form a complex of multiple units as depicted in [Figure 4].

=== Type III ===
The Type III MCPS is a later design fitted with plain and window walls that may accommodate SHC and ASH ducting, and full set of insulated liners is shipped with the tent. An entrance wall with a centrally located door opening may be fitted with a standard TEMPER vestibule, or replaced with a bootwall to attach the tent to vehicles or other structures.

== Use ==
=== Stand-alone ===
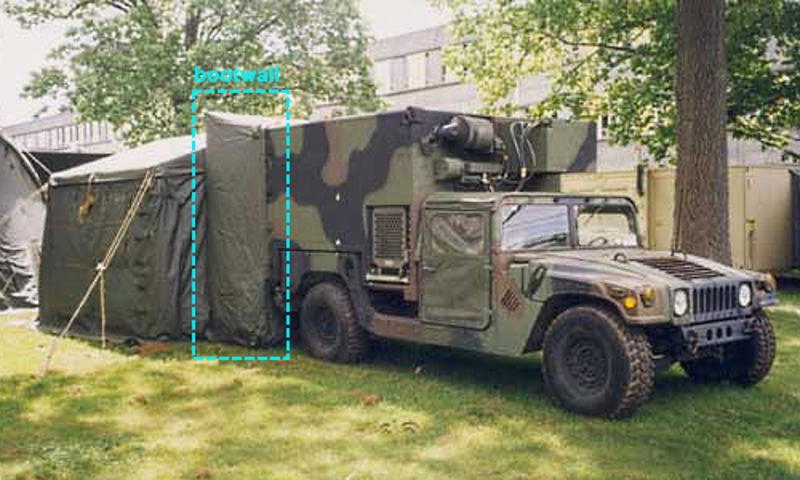
A SICPS Humvee with a MCPS tent. The bootwall connecting the tent to the vehicle is indicated.

Both Type I and Type III MCPS units can be configured as stand-alone tents, either as individual units or joined together to form a complex of multiple units.

=== To other shelters ===
When used with appropriate bootwalls, Type III MCPS units can be attached to other U.S. Army shelters including:

- Rigid wall shelters (RWS)
  - S-250 Shelter, Non-Expandable (NSN 5411-00-999-4935)
  - S-787 Standardized Integrated Command Post System (SICPS) RWS (NSN 5411-01-333-0663)
  - S-832 Shelter, Non-Expandable, Lightweight, Multipurpose (NSN 5411-01-436-3326)
- Non-rigid shelters (tents)
  - Tent, Extendable, Modular, Personnel (TEMPER)
  - Modular General Purpose Tent System (MGPTS)

=== With vehicles ===
Type III MCPS units are connect to tactical vehicles through the use of a vehicle-specific bootwall that replaces a side wall or end wall. Bootwalls are available for:

- M1037 4x4 shelter carrier
- M1063 standard integrated command post system carrier
- M1097 heavy HMMWV
- M1113 HMMWV expanded capacity vehicle

== Manufacturers ==
Various companies manufacture MCPS units according to US Department of Defense contracts. Manufacturers include:

- Camel Manufacturing
- Eureka Tents
- Outdoor Venture Corporation

== Civilian use ==
The rugged construction and versatility of MCPS units make them popular with civilian buyers. They are often sold through camping equipment suppliers, military equipment surplus stores and through auctions and auction sites. They are also used by aid agencies for disaster relief and humanitarian aid missions, such as after earthquakes or for internally displaced persons in countries experiencing war.

== Specifications ==
Official specifications are as follows:

- Dimensions
  - Length: 11 feet (3.35 m)
  - Width: 11 feet (3.35 m)
  - Ridge height: 9 feet (2.74 m)
  - Eve height: 7 feet (2.13 m)
  - Floor area: 121 square feet
  - Weight: 257 pounds
- Material
  - Fabric: water resistant, mildew resistant, 13.5oz polyester duck
  - Colours: Camouflage Green (#483) or Desert Tan (#459)
- Packaging
  - Container dimensions: 69x27x28 inches
  - Shipping weight: 450–482 pounds
- NATO stock number (NSN)
  - Green: 8340-01-323-2454
  - Tan: 8340-01-334-7529
- Set-up/strike-down time (with 2 persons)
  - Set-up: 20 minutes
  - Strike-down: 15 minutes
